The Dresden Files, a contemporary fantasy/mystery novel series written by American author Jim Butcher, features a wide cast of characters. The book series was also made into a live-action television series which ran in 2007.

Main characters

Harry Dresden

Species: Human (Wizard)
Description: Private investigator, (Former) Regional Commander of the White Council's Wardens, Knight of the Winter Court, Warden of Demonreach Prison, Wizard of Chicago.

Harry Blackstone Copperfield Dresden is a wizard and the protagonist of the series. He works as a supernatural private investigator in Chicago, dealing with paranormal crimes and consulting for the Chicago Police Department. The novels are written from Harry's perspective, in the style of hardboiled detective fiction. In the television series, he is portrayed by Paul Blackthorne.

Bob
Species: Spirit of intellect/air elemental
Description: Repository of magical knowledge

First appearing in Storm Front, Bob is a "spirit of intellect" who inhabits a skull perched on a shelf in the laboratory beneath Harry's apartment. He is bound to the skull and its owner's wishes. He is free to leave the skull if given permission by his owner, but he will die if exposed to sunlight without a host body. His usual vessel is Harry's cat, Mister, who does not seem to mind Bob's presence. He is a major character in both the book and television series. Bob was created to fit the mold of the "Talking head" trope when the story called for exposition on a topic.  In the television series, he is portrayed as an incorporeal human bound to the skull, and is played by Terrence Mann.

Molly Carpenter
Species: former Human (Wizard); now High Sidhe (Winter Lady)
Description: Apprentice to Harry Dresden from Proven Guilty until Changes, Winter Lady as of the end of Cold Days

Molly Carpenter is the daughter of Michael and Charity Carpenter, a skilled illusionist and the Winter Lady. Her first appearance was as a supporting character in Proven Guilty, who seeks out Dresden's help when her boyfriend is arrested as a suspect in an assault. During his investigation, Dresden learns that Molly is a wizard and has been using dark magic. At the end of the book, she is placed under the Doom of Damocles (a form of probation) by the White Council, with Dresden as her mentor. After Dresden's death in Changes, Molly struck out on her own, coming to be known as the Rag Lady, due to her vigilante activities and her calling card: a strip of cloth from the remains of Dresden's fae armor in Changes, which she stuffs into the mouths of her victims. It is revealed that the Leanansidhe has been training her in more advance magic, using pain to motivate her. During the events of Cold Days, Molly discovers Dresden's return to life, and eventually absorbs the mantle of the Winter Lady, after which she returns to Arctis Tor with Mab. Molly has frequently expressed a romantic interest in Dresden, but her affections are not returned.

Molly's magical talents are very different from Dresden's. She is not capable of moving around as much energy as he is, but she is much more talented in illusion and mind magic. It is shown at one point that her own mind takes on the form of a treehouse, inside of which is the bridge of the starship Enterprise, with copies of herself taking different roles at the various stations. She has been described as "sensitive", and she is capable of using dangerous and complicated mind magic with little or no training, while also making her quite literally sensitive to strong emotions and magic around her.

Karrin Murphy
Species: Human (deceased)
Description: Former Sergeant, previously Lieutenant, in the Chicago PD assigned to Special Investigations; leader of the Paranet as per Ghost Story

Karrin Murphy is a major character who was introduced in the first book of the series, Storm Front. She is a Chicago police detective, and the head of the Special Investigations (SI) division, which handles cases in which something unexplainable or supernatural is involved. Later in the series, she is demoted from her leadership position, and later forced out of the department entirely. In the early books, she seems to be Dresden's best friend, but a romantic tension arises between them later in the series. By the events of Changes, her and Dresden agree to kindle a romantic relationship, but are prevented from doing so until Peace Talks by Dresden's death and resurrection as the Winter Knight. In Battle Ground, she is accidentally shot and killed by a panicking Detective Rudolph after killing a Jotun (represented in the series as a giant) with a rocket launcher. At the end of the book, Gard confirms that Murphy will one day reincarnate into an Einherjar, but that will not be until the memory of her fades from the minds of those who knew her.

Karrin has wielded Fidelacchius, one of the three swords of the Knights of the Cross on multiple occasions, and when Dresden viewed her with his Wizard's Sight, he saw her as a warrior angel. She is the character whom Dresden most often confides in.

Thomas Raith

Species: Vampire (White Court)
Description: Former salon owner and hairstylist, half-brother of Harry Dresden.

Thomas Raith is introduced as a vampire of the White Court (an incubus) in Grave Peril. He possesses a perfect human physique, supernatural strength, speed, and healing ability; all drawn from a demonic hunger within him. He appears in every book between Death Masks and Cold Days, and is the star of his own novelette, entitled Backup: A Story of the Dresden Files. He and Harry have the same mother.

Recurring characters

The Archive (Ivy)
Species: Human
Description: Repository of all written human knowledge and wisdom

The character known as The Archive was introduced in Death Masks as a young girl who serves as a repository of all written human knowledge. She holds a position which has been passed down a magical family line from mother to daughter over the past five thousand years. She is usually accompanied by Jared Kincaid, who serves as her bodyguard, driver and caretaker. 

As a result of her position, she is possessed of incredible magical talent, During an attack on her person in Small Favor, Ivy (then 11 years old) was able to combat eight powerful Denarians at once and match each of them spell for spell, even with limited spell energy at the time. She was given the name Ivy by Dresden; prior to this she had no given name, being referred to simply as "the Archive".

Georgia Borden
Species: Werewolf (human stock)
Description: Psychology student (as of Turn Coat), member of the Alphas

Introduced in Fool Moon, Georgia is Billy Borden's girlfriend (later wife) and a capable member of the Alphas. She is a studious psychology student and a steady presence when Billy or the Alphas appear in the series. She is often the voice of reason and a grounding influence for Billy, who is inclined to put himself in situations where he is beyond his limits or useful abilities when he wants to help Harry.

Georgia is one of the first to notice Harry's erratic behavior after he acquired Lasciel's Blackened Denarius. A friend to Harry, she worries about his mental health, and she shares her concerns with Billy before he confronts Harry. In the short story "Something Borrowed", just before her wedding, she was kidnapped by the Faerie Jenny Greenteeth, who assumed her appearance. Harry and Murphy found her in Undertown in a comatose state guarded by shellycobs. Harry got her out of there and to the wedding just in time to ruin Jenny Greenteeth's plan to marry Billy and kill him. Like Sleeping Beauty's predicament, only true love's kiss could wake her. Billy provided that kiss, and they then transformed and brutally mauled Jenny as the wedding guests were running away.

In the novella "Aftermath", it is revealed that she is seven months pregnant and able to resist the spell cast on her by the Fomor. Further, she is revealed to have much better tracking abilities than Will, her husband.

William Borden
Species: Werewolf (human stock)
Description: Engineer, former university student; leader of the Alphas

Billy was introduced in Fool Moon as a young and rather naive man trying to do the right thing. He and a group of his friends (the "Alphas") used magic to transform into large wolves. They patrolled their neighborhood in wolf form, vigilantly keeping out vampires and other creatures. Over the course of the series, Billy's wolf form has transformed his human body from husky to athletic and muscular. He married longtime girlfriend Georgia (also an Alpha), whom he met before the events of Fool Moon. He often serves as a friend to Harry, inviting him to games of Arcanos, similar to Dungeons & Dragons (and is also the in-universe writer of The Dresden Files Roleplaying Game, which is presented as his attempt to educate people about the way the supernatural world works).

As of Turn Coat, Harry has begun calling him Will instead of Billy, an acknowledgment of the maturity Will has gained since their meeting when Billy was a college student. Harry admits the mistake he made in intentionally keeping the younger man ignorant of most of the supernatural world.

In the novella Aftermath he teams up with Murphy to rescue his kidnapped wife, Georgia, who is 7 months pregnant. Will and Marci both demonstrate a newfound ability to heal quickly, if imperfectly as the result leaves them drained of energy and with bad scars. He and Murphy decide to form a 'Justice League' of Chicago in Harry's absence at the end of the novella.

In the events of Ghost Story, Will has made a strong personality change, becoming more aggressive and sarcastic than before. He offers deliberate insults to Daniel Carpenter and offers to fight the young man. Further, he suggests staging attacks on members of the magical community to scare them into proper safety procedures.

Waldo Butters
Species: Human
Description: Assistant medical examiner for Chicago, Knight of the Cross

First introduced in Death Masks, Waldo Butters was the medical examiner assigned to do the autopsy of a body relating to one of Harry's cases. It is revealed that Butters had earlier been the one to examine the corpses of vampires killed in the fire at the end of Grave Peril, and as a result of his description of them as "humanoid, but not human", he had spent ninety days in a mental institution. By the events of Ghost Story, he is Bob the skull's new owner, and in Skin Game, he becomes one of the knights of the cross, using the broken sword Fidelacchius, which has a lightsaber like blade when wielded by Butters.

He loves polka music and has built a suit with instruments attached that allows him to perform as a one-man band. Despite Butter's apparent "geekiness" and love of all things polka, Harry holds him in high regard and treats him like a family member. Despite considering himself a coward, Butters has repeatedly demonstrated a level of bravery, often when he perceives there to be no other option. He regularly uses his medical skills to patch up injured characters who, for whatever reason, could not go to the hospital.

Charity Carpenter
Species: Human
Description: Full-time homemaker, amateur blacksmith and swordswoman

First appearing in Grave Peril, Charity Carpenter is the wife of Michael Joseph Patrick Carpenter and mother of Molly, Daniel, Matthew, Alicia, Amanda, Hope, and Harry (named for Harry Dresden after the events of Grave Peril). Her other living relations include at least one sister, as revealed in Grave Peril.

She is portrayed as an excellent cook, a master swordswoman, a skilled amateur blacksmith, and a former magic practitioner. Her attitude towards Dresden in Grave Peril is notably chilly, and she repeatedly makes it clear she wants Harry nowhere near her husband. The dislike seems initially linked to his tendency to get her husband into trouble and the fact that Michael often returns from his missions involving Dresden injured. However, following Dresden's rescue of Molly in Proven Guilty, her attitude takes a dramatic change for the better. Eventually, Charity confides in Dresden about her past, and it becomes clear that her earlier distrust of him stemmed from her negative associations with magic in her youth. By the events of Small Favor, Charity indicates a fondness for Dresden, referring to him as "family".

Michael Carpenter
Species: Human
Description: Carpenter, Former Knight of the Cross (sometimes called by others, Knight of the Sword).

Michael Joseph Patrick Carpenter is the husband of Charity Carpenter and father of Molly, Daniel, Matthew, Alicia, Amanda, Hope, and Harry. His youngest child was named for Harry Dresden after the events of Grave Peril, Michael's first appearance in the series. He is a close friend of, and occasional sidekick to Harry, frequently serving as a voice of morality and adherence to Christianity, often to Harry's chagrin. As of the Knights of the Cross, he wields Amoracchius; a sword with one of the nails from the crucifixion embedded in it. It is a powerful weapon, capable of cutting through steel and repelling demonic creatures.

He is a devoutly faithful man, praying frequently. He sometimes gets visions from angels telling him what he is to do or where he is needed, but more often this guidance is a subtle skewing of chance ensuring Michael is at the right place at the right time that his aid is needed. He is an experienced carpenter and construction worker, constantly improving on his house to hold his growing family.

In Small Favor he was badly injured while rescuing the Archive from the Order of the Blackened Denarius, suffering a shattered pelvis, damaged spine, collapsed lung, and destroyed kidney among other minor injuries. He gives up his position as a Knight and entrusts his Sword to Harry's care; Karrin Murphy later takes custody of it, not trusting Harry to be able to make a good decision on who should wield it.

In Skin Game, Michael temporarily returns to wielding Amoracchius to support Harry.

Corpsetaker
Species: Human (Deceased) 
Description: Warlock

Corpsetaker has first appeared in Dead Beat, as one of the disciples of the necromancer Kemmler, attempting to perform the Darkhallow. The alias she uses stems from her ability to possess another person's body and take it for her own, as is shown in Dead Beat when she switches bodies with Warden Anastasia Luccio. She is also proficient in mental magic, breaking into Harry's mind without much difficulty to find out information about the Darkhallow and the book Die Lied de Erlking.

After her supposed death in Dead Beat, in Ghost Story the Corpsetaker is revealed to have survived as the bodiless Grey Ghost. At the end of the book Corpsetaker was sent to Hell by Mortimer Lindquist.

Jared Kincaid/Hellhound
Species: Half-human, half-demon scion (alleged by Ebenezar McCoy)
Description: Mercenary, former guardian of the Archive

Jared Kincaid is his modern name, but the Hellhound was the name used by this half-human killer when working for Drakul himself, centuries before. He appears to be in his thirties, a tall, handsome man "with dark golden hair, just long enough to look a little exotic, sporting gray-blue eyes that missed nothing... built like a swimmer more than a weight lifter, all leonine power and lazy grace taken completely for granted" but to a wizard's Sight, he appears as an enormous horned, bat-winged entity. He is a killer of incredible ability, who doesn't miss what he shoots at, tremendous (although concealed) strength, speed, and recuperative ability. He seems skilled in all the possible black op and special forces tricks and tactics one could ask for, from commenting how he'd snipe Harry down from a thousand yards away if Harry cheats him to avoid a death curse, to being able to take out two Denarians with one shot.

His combat experience is immense and not restricted to firearms. Brought down by several vampiric hounds and Renfields, he not only lives through the fight, he kills all his enemies. In Small Favor he is responsible for the deaths of at least five, possibly six Denarians, and is only brought down when he actually shows himself in a last-ditch effort to save Ivy. He is extremely inventive about the appropriate equipment he brings to a fight (proper costumes and identification, sawed off shotguns, boar-spears with explosive caps, paint guns shooting holy water balls, and so forth). His recuperative abilities are immense, he can generally recover from any attack given time. Despite what seems an extraordinary amount of fighting experience, he actually has little experience with direct magical combat and wizardry (although he is VERY well versed on all the magical tricks/effects non-spellcasters can use), confessing that he'd never seen a wizard 'cut loose' like Harry did in Blood Rites. He is also a consummate actor, showing the ability to switch accents easily, and playing the part of an emergency worker as easily as that of a cop. He has a visual range that extends at least into the infrared, a sense of smell at least as sharp as a dog, and presumably superb hearing and touch to go with it.

Although possessed of a shady past, Kincaid is scrupulous about honoring his obligations, despite his own misgivings, even if it causes personal injury. He has crossed paths with and shares a mutual enmity with Harry's mentor Ebenezar "Blackstaff" McCoy; the precise reason for the feud is unclear, although it dates to an incident in Istanbul about a century before the time frame of the books. All that McCoy would say on the subject was that there were certain boundaries between those in their profession based on professional courtesy and respect, and that Kincaid had crossed them.

Kincaid is currently under a continuing long-term contract to The Archive. This latter service of guarding a terribly powerful young girl seems to have softened him somewhat, as his loyalty and affection to her seem to go far above and beyond what a mere contract would require, and he seems to see himself and Harry as the only thing that Ivy has as far as family goes after she is kidnapped in Small Favor. He also worked for Ivy's grandmother when she was the Archive, and was a friend of Ivy's angry, tragic mother. Amusingly, when Kincaid sees Ivy cheerfully playing with Harry's cat Mister, he remarks "Now that's scary". Following the events at the end of Changes, Ivy informs Kincaid that his services are no longer required.

Kincaid also has a purely sexual "friendship" with Karrin Murphy, although she confesses in Small Favor that she has romantic feelings for him as well. Whether these are reciprocated is unknown, though she has stated he gave her chocolates and a gun with "we'll always have Hawaii" engraved on it, something Murphy refuses to comment on. She also revealed his first name to Dresden, before their relationship apparently ends.

Changes ends with Harry being shot and falling off his temporary home on the Water Beetle into the freezing water with a bullet wound in his chest, and according to the author he was indeed dead. More detail emerges in Ghost Story, as Harry learns that he was shot by a high velocity sniper round fired from the rooftop of a building hundreds of meters away, almost precisely the manner in which Kincaid once told Harry he would kill him if it came down to it. Near the end of the novel, Harry discovers that he had arranged for Kincaid to kill him, believing that he would eventually lose his humanity once he accepted Mab's offer to become the Winter Knight. Molly Carpenter had then removed Harry's memory of that conversation so that he could attempt to deceive Mab when they met to close the deal.

Anastasia Luccio
Species: Human (Wizard)
Description: Captain of the Wardens of the White Council

Anastasia is a highly talented wizard and Warden who is the former Captain of the Wardens. She was born sometime in the 1800s, in Italy. In Small Favor, it is insinuated that she was rather promiscuous in her younger days, and often modeled in the nude. Captain Luccio is a powerful wizard with considerable influence in the White Council. She is the only known maker of the enchantment breaking swords the Wardens carry.

She was forced to cede active control of the Wardens when her soul was switched with the then-current body of "Capriocorpus" or "The Corpsetaker" during the events of Dead Beat. Because of the switching of bodies, she had to allow Morgan to take command of all forces while she recovered. Her new body, that of a young brunette woman, lacks many of the strengths of her original one. Specifically, she can no longer make the Wardens' swords. This is explained as one of the consequences of her new body not having the same potential for magical power as her original body. It is because of this, that Harry has not been given a sword (rather than the assumed reason, lack of trust).

Despite severe incompatibility between human magic and modern technology, she took a liking to computers and enjoyed reading about them nonetheless. As such, she had accumulated amount of computer-related knowledge unexpected of a wizard of her caliber and age.

In the opening pages of War Cry, she appears as the commander of the Warden force fighting a losing battle against the Red Court's vampires in Palermo, Sicily. She and a few volunteers act as rearguard to allow the majority of their forces to teleport to safety, though she and the few survivors are badly wounded.

During her recovery, she started up a Warden boot camp and, later, other training facilities for new Wardens such as the one in New Mexico. Captain Luccio is a calm and level-headed woman who understands situations from a very logical perspective, doing things that the Council does not normally approve of. She appears to prefer fire magic similar to Harry's, though with a more graceful air and control about it. During the events of Small Favor, and due to her effective second youth (and consequent sex drive) she exchanges flirtations with Harry, even so far as going on a date with him and sleeping with him.

As of "Harry's Day Off", a short story printed in an anthology titled "Blood Lite", she and Harry seem to have an ongoing relationship, though the overtones are still flirtatious and casual.

By the time of Turn Coat, she and Harry have a rather intense (and sexual) relationship, with Harry referring to "wild monkey sex". It turns out that her new body has lessened her psychic defenses, and that she is one of the Wardens being controlled by the traitor. She "sleep-murdered" LaFortier without remembering it, and Morgan covered for her. The situation it causes makes waves for her and Harry. She later realizes she was pushed towards Harry so she could unconsciously keep tabs on Harry for the traitor. She breaks up with him tearfully, though she admits she's still fond of him (and liked the sex). In Changes, Luccio remains friendly with Harry, and warns Harry to stay away from Edinburgh because of the disasters in the White Council. She vanishes after questioning Cristos.

"Gentleman" John Marcone
Species: Human
Description: Businessman, mob boss, Freeholding Lord and Baron of Chicago under the Unseelie Accords.

John Marcone is the most powerful crime boss in Chicago and an antagonist of Dresden's, though the two have worked together far more often than they have opposed each other. This has largely been due to some supernatural predator or villain causing collateral damage to Marcone's business interests and him relying on Dresden to deal with the problem, but Harry has asked for Marcone's help at least twice. Marcone controls the majority of organized crime in Chicago and has developed considerable knowledge of the supernatural aspects of the city. His past and motives are, for the most part, a mystery. Even his name is suspect; Marcone states in Even Hand that "My name is something I rarely trouble to remember, but for most of my adult life, I have been called John Marcone".

Befitting of a mob boss, Marcone prefers to use intelligence and influence to get his work done and prefers not to kill if he doesn't have to (even responding to Nicodemus's offer of an alliance by making a counter-offer of a job for him). Despite this, he's an exceptionally skilled combatant in multiple fields: during Fool Moon he throws a knife with enough precision and force to cut one of the ropes holding him suspended over a pit, and in Death Masks he fires several bursts from an AK-47 that hit Nicodemus perfectly without touching the Shroud of Turin that he was wearing, all while on top a moving train.

During the events of Death Masks, Marcone planned to steal the Shroud of Turin, in order to use its legendary healing powers on a young Jane Doe he has sequestered in a hospital care facility in Wisconsin. Marcone's relationship to the girl is unknown, as is whether his use of the Shroud led to any change in her condition. In White Night the comatose girl is revealed as being Greg and Helen Beckitt's daughter (from Storm Front). Marcone feels responsible for the girl as her condition is due to her taking a bullet meant for him in a drive-by shooting. It is later revealed that Helen Beckitt does not know of her daughter's survival.

Due to his assistance and role in the events of White Night, Marcone has become one of the few free lords of the Unseelie Accords that partially govern the magical world, and the only non-magical mortal to take such a position. He is styled "Baron Marcone" in the tradition of life peers in the British peerage system.

In Small Favor, he is kidnapped and tortured by the Denarians. As a result of this, Marcone has lost part of his ear. Harry also learns that Helen Beckitt, the madam of his brothel, has been leaking information to Marcone's main rival. Ms. Beckitt is unaware that Marcone has her comatose daughter in a hospital; she believes the girl died in the shooting. She blames Marcone for her daughter's (apparent) death.

Marcone has kept her daughter's condition from Ms. Beckitt because he believes it would further damage her mind. He also seems to be sexually involved with her, though it is doubtful if love or romance have anything to do with this, either on his part or hers. It is implied that information Ms. Beckitt leaked to the Knights of the Blackened Denarius led to them capturing and torturing Marcone. He is either unaware of her actions, choosing not to do anything about them, or choosing not to tell Harry Dresden that he's doing anything about them. The first two would be out of character for Marcone; it is far more probable that he simply is electing not to mention his plans for Helen Beckitt to a hot-tempered wizard who has a difficult time harming female enemies (human and non-human alike) simply because they are female.

Although ruthless in most ways, Marcone seems to have a strong personal code of honor and a soft spot when it comes to children, as witnessed by his trying to help Jane Doe, a.k.a. Amanda Beckitt, his putting the well-being of the Archive above his own during the rescue in Small Favor, and his protection of Justine and a child she rescued from slavery to a Fomor in Even Hand. It is commented that any adult is fair game for one of his criminal enterprises, and any child is strictly off limits, and that Marcone has personally "disappeared" any of his employees who cross that line. When Harry's daughter Maggie is kidnapped in Changes, the two men meet at a Burger King (chosen deliberately by Harry just to irritate Marcone) and Marcone indirectly steers him to Donar Vadderung for help and advice. Harry believes that Marcone genuinely cares about the welfare of innocents, though he still sees Marcone as a villain. In Ghost Story, Harry learns that Marcone is the major backer of the Chicago Alliance, an organization of magical and non-magical individuals set up after his death to defend Chicago against supernatural threats.

In Skin Game, Nicodemus organizes a team to break into a high-security vault in the Nevernever; to do so, they must first penetrate Marcone's vault at a mob-controlled bank. At the end of the story, Harry realizes that Marcone, Queen Mab, and Hades (the Greek god of the underworld) set Nicodemus up to carry out the robbery in order to get revenge on him for his earlier kidnapping of Marcone. Marcone also makes it clear to Dresden that they are now even and Marcone's debt for being rescued from the Denarians by Harry is paid, after Harry uses the weregild rules of the accord to pay for the damage and death of one of Marcone's guards.

After the events of the short story "Aftermath", Marcone, through his security contractor Ms. Gard, offers to get Murphy back her job and rank at Chicago PD with no strings attached or repayment expected, as she and Will had (involuntarily) helped Marcone prevent an attempted takeover of some of his territory. Murphy, although she briefly considered it, declines the offer.

Peace Talks is a new chance for Marcone to show off, as he is the host for the event. Although he is not a central player in the novel, he is the mortal representative the Fomor insult the most and act against when they arrive, and so represents all of non-magical humanity at the meeting. When the Titan Ethniu attacks Chicago in Battle Ground, Marcone organizes part of the counter-attack and reveals himself to Harry as the new host for Namshiel, a member of the Order of the Blackened Denarius. At the end of the novel, Harry forces Marcone to turn over his castle-like stronghold, built over the sub-basement that Harry had used as his laboratory.

Donald Morgan
Species: Human (wizard, deceased)
Description: Field Commander, Warden of the White Council

Morgan had long gray hair pulled back in a ponytail, and a craggy face with a perpetually grim, often sour expression. He was apparently Germanic in origin.

Morgan was a very intense and powerful man with a talent for evocation spells, specifically those using Earth magic. He was a stickler for rules and had been a Warden for over a century, a job that he took very seriously. He had an innate distrust of Dresden that often led him to assume that Harry was at fault in certain situations. Morgan's sword is able to cut through magical shields, something which has nearly led to Dresden's wrongful death at least once. He often gloated when Harry was in trouble, anticipating the opportunity to execute what he saw as justice for the self-defense killing Harry committed as a teenager.

Though Harry and Morgan never actually got along, since Dead Beat they had developed a wary mutual respect. Harry has come to realize Morgan's hostility likely comes from the battle-scarred veteran's frustration at fighting black magic for over a century. Morgan was, in effect, a burned-out cop. Morgan grudgingly admitted that he no longer sees Harry as evil or willfully destructive, and he believes Harry tries to do the right thing, even if it keeps blowing up in their faces.

It's possible that Morgan's hatred and distrust of Harry had relaxed even further. During the events of Proven Guilty, Morgan very visibly seems to take Harry's side with regard to Molly Carpenter's fate, yet he doesn't appear ready to act on his instincts. At the conclusion of Proven Guilty, Harry refuses to consider Morgan as the potential traitor on the White Council; instead, Harry believes, while the two men rarely see eye-to-eye, Morgan is fundamentally an honest man.

As the central conflict of Turn Coat, Morgan is accused of treason when he's found over the body of LaFortier, and subsequently escapes his prison to seek sanctuary with Harry. Complications ensue when it transpires that Morgan has long been in love with Captain Luccio, who was then in a relationship with Harry. Morgan is badly injured when escaping and becomes seriously ill while staying with Harry, yet is still vigilant enough to critique Harry's behavior, watch Molly for signs of black magic, and pine after Luccio. Morgan turns himself in for the murder to save the person he believes guilty. Harry reveals the true culprit and is almost killed, but Morgan intervenes, pushing his injured body past the breaking point. Morgan and Dresden make their peace moments before Morgan dies of his injuries.

In the TV adaptation, Conrad Coates portrays Morgan. He is quite different from the book Morgan: Coates is an African American with short hair, and a business suit rather than a gray cloak. Additionally, the TV Morgan is more willing to work alongside Harry and give him information, and rarely taunts or snipes at Harry.

Mouse
Species: Temple Dog or Foo Dog (similar to a Caucasian Shepherd Dog or Tibetan Mastiff, a descendant of a divine guardian spirit and a mortal canine)
Description: Guardian/companion to Margaret Angelica Mendoza Dresden (Maggie)

Mouse was introduced in the novel Blood Rites as a small furry puppy rescued from a group of demons. A Tibetan monk employed Harry to recover a stolen litter of puppies believed to be the descendants of an ancient Foo spirit. This meant they were supernatural and special, both qualities that Mouse has shown as he has attained his massive mature size. While Harry returned all the Foo puppies he could find, one particularly scrappy pup hid under his car seat and he was unable to return it. Mouse grows startlingly large by the start of Dead Beat, with his shoulders reaching nearly to Harry's waist, and kills the former Denarian Quintus Cassius in order to prevent him from killing Harry.

In Proven Guilty Mouse was hit by a car and survived, and he went on to take down supernatural enemies while emitting a faint glow. Mouse has shown an aptitude for detecting dark energies and presences, and he has a strong empathy for humans who display no such dark traces. He also shows intelligence greater than that of any other dog, and seems able to plan, anticipate and comprehend abstract concepts, as well as speech. In addition, in White Night when Harry begins to play the guitar (poorly) as part of therapy for his hand, Mouse gets up off the living room floor and goes into the bedroom, shutting the door behind him. In Turn Coat Mouse intercedes in several violent situations in Harry's apartment while he is away, defusing them with both his strength and intelligence. He even feigns extreme pain after being shot to teach Molly an important lesson, without any prompting by Harry.

After Mouse exhibits further supernatural abilities in White Night, Bob describes additional powers the dog has, such as a warning bark that awoke an entire building full of people during a fire when the actual alarm could not be activated. This bark can also apparently scare away some supernatural, incorporeal beings. If that doesn't work, Mouse can actually physically damage a supernatural enemy, usually with his teeth, as has happened with fatal effects during two battles. Also in White Night, Elaine claims that Mouse is a Temple Dog and is stunned he belongs to Harry. Oddly, in Proven Guilty Madrigal Raith exclaims with apprehension that Mouse is "not a dog". In Small Favor, Nicodemus shows a genuine uneasiness about Mouse's presence in his meeting with Harry, asking Harry "What is that?" and making sure to keep his shadow in between himself and Mouse.

Despite growing to massive size, Mouse still defers to Mister, allowing the cat to eat before he does and appearing nervous after Harry tells him to take away Mister's catnip before he gets ill. This is possibly because Mister is older than he is and he is showing respect to an elder. Harry calls him a cross between a chow, a woolly mammoth, and a "West Highland Dogosaurus".

The guardian statues that the White Council uses to guard meeting entrances are modeled after Foo Dogs. In Turn Coat, Ancient Mai is shocked that Harry has a Foo dog (exclaiming, "Where did you get such a thing? And why were you allowed to keep it?"), apparently not taking Mouse's wishes into account. However, she and several other wizards in attendance confirm his reliability as a witness, and Harry uses him and a set of surveillance photos to expose a traitor within the White Council.

In Small Favor, it is indicated that Mouse, in addition to comprehending speech, can show emotion on a level with humans - when told to "take the catnip away" if it makes Mister sick, he seems to indicate doubt; when Thomas claims that what he said earlier about Harry was a joke, Mouse merely flicks his ears and turns away. Also, when Harry jokes about shaking himself dry like Mouse in Michael Carpenter's home, Michael responds that Mouse would be too polite to do so inside and is promptly proven correct.

In Changes, Mouse is proven to have intelligence as great as any human, and in correct circumstances the ability not only to comprehend human speech but also to communicate as well as any human in his own language. He is also referred to as a "Mountain Ice Demon from the Land of Dreams" by two high ranking Red Court vampires, as well as Harry's Fairy Godmother, who, if not afraid of Mouse, is at least wary of his abilities. He also indicates, when the Leanansidhe questioned Harry's having "won" Mouse, he was the one who "won" Harry, raising the question as to which one actually "owns" the other, although Jim Butcher has stated that Mouse and the Leanansidhe did not mean the same thing when they said "won". In addition, it is here shown that he has a personality very similar to Dresden's, evidenced both by his willingness to fight and kill Lea in order to turn the group back to normal (Harry and several allies had been shapeshifted into dogs by Lea during a mission) after remarking, "That bitch", and his response to Lea's comment that he was far from his sources of power to which Mouse is described as shrugging and replying "I live with a wizard, I cheat". While it's possible that the similar personalities are a result of living with Harry most of his life, even as a puppy Mouse displayed the very Harry-like trait of standing up to things far bigger than him.

In Ghost Story, Mouse is the protector of Maggie Dresden and living with the Carpenter family. He is able to see and physically interact with the spirit form of Harry. The archangel Uriel calls Mouse "little brother" and tells him his task is not yet over. Uriel also assures Harry that temple dogs live for centuries, and Mouse is more than capable of protecting Maggie for a lifetime, even a wizard's lifetime.

In Cold Days, Harry and Molly stop by the Carpenter house to pick him up before moving against the Outsiders' assault on Demonreach Island.

In Skin Game, Mouse is still Maggie's protector, and is in fact allowed to go with her to school as a service dog. This disturbs Harry somewhat when he realizes that, with Mouse's intelligence, he will attain a formal educational level higher than Harry ever did, although he can easily picture Mouse getting along well with everyone at the school and enjoying attention while acting like a "normal" friendly dog, especially after Michael tells him that several kids are allowed to play with Mouse during recess as a reward.

During the events of Peace Talks, Mouse is shown to be able to sense Dark Elves moving through stone, and his bark can prevent them from exiting it and force them back inside, leaving them unable to exit and threaten Harry's daughter.

Lara Raith
Species: White Court vampire
Description: The true leader of the White Court, former "adult" movie star.

Assumed to be the eldest daughter of the White King, Lara is described as being "not easily quantifiable" regarding beauty, grace, or art. She's tall, with glossy, curly hair "so dark that its highlights were nearly blue...with eyes of dark gray with hints of violet twilight at their centers". Lara is perhaps the most dangerous of the White Court, a master manipulator, conspirator and seductress. Above all else her word is always honest; being given safe passage by Lara always ensures she will go to extreme lengths to preserve her word. Since secretly taking over from her father she has ended all threats to his position of power, removing the leaders of the other two houses and beefing up security. While ruthless and practical from her father's lessons (and punishments) she does have a few desires to do the right thing such as helping her younger sister find true love away from the family as opposed to their father's desire to awaken her vampire side and become another pawn of his. Whether this is due to her true feelings, 'rebellion' against her father, fear/respect of Dresden, something else or any combination of the above is open to debate. She tried to push a peace effort between the Red Court and White Council for unknown reasons, but due to the White Court's nature to be self-serving, backstabbing schemers and traitors, this is unlikely to be for the benefit of either the council or the Red Court. Any influence, rewards, etc. she was hoping from the Red Court was essentially null and voided after Harry and Susan turned an uber spell the Red Court was casting against them.

After the events of Blood Rites, Harry and Lara are currently locked in a stalemate as Harry knows the White King has become a mere figurehead (Lara 'challenged' Daddy to a supremacy duel after finding out his power was blocked) and Lara knows Thomas is Harry's half-brother. Despite the growing hostility between them, there appears to be a great deal of respect as well, in particular from Lara for Dresden's own skills at manipulation and deduction. She might even consider Dresden 'family' somewhat (as Thomas is half her brother and half his) but can't really do much other than 'help' with strings attached for political reasons. She might even like him a little as he helped her younger sister despite his bad relations with the family and lack of reward among other things. On the other hand, it could (partly) be self-preservation on her part to keep her father from 'waking up' and regaining his power since the spell blocking it off is self-sustaining and active only as long as Harry and Thomas live.

In White Night Lara offers Harry a chance to work for her, and Harry once again turns her down. There she also shows the capabilities she has in a fight where she and Thomas single-handedly stop cold a group of charging uber-ghouls. She repeats the offer for Harry to join her in Turn Coat and when faced with death from the Council Harry seems to actually consider it.

At the end of Changes, Lara, though not seen directly, re-asserts her power to Harry by somehow making a U.S. Navy Cruiser and helicopter available for the extraction of Molly, Mouse, and her brother Thomas. During Cold Days, she again makes her influence known through an emergency credit card given to Thomas; it is valid for 24 hours after first being used and has no limit. She is also helping Murphy and co discreetly, as a silent partner for unknown reasons after Harry was sniped.

During Peace Talks, Lara is a primary protagonist, spending Favors directly with Mab and literally forcing Harry to act with her to rescue her little brother Thomas from captivity, forming the primary driving force of the novel. Her devotion to her family, and especially Thomas, the only brother she had left, is showcased, and her age is alluded to; she was taught martial arts in Japan in the 1880s. Lara admits that she knew Ebenezar McCoy was Thomas's grandfather from the beginning and Margaret once entrusted her to look after Thomas while she went visiting her father hinting their bonds. After Margaret escaped, Lara was the one who changed his diaper and took care of him as he grew older. She was one of the few people who learned of Harry and Karrin after her elbow burn from the physical contact on his skin and congratulated him.

Her White Court seduction ability was shown to work on even an Einheriar. She has also acquired a Valkyrie bodyguard, who is immensely distracted by her presence. As one of the major powers of the Dresdenverse supernatural community, she has a seat at the table for adding the Fomor to the Accords. At the end of Battle Ground, Queen Mab surprises Lara when she explains that the alliance they had just struck between Winter and the White Court means that it will be sealed by the marriage of Harry to Lara. They manage to suspend the wedding from Mab's planned date of tomorrow, to a year from the engagement.

Carlos Ramirez
Species: Human (wizard)
Description: Warden, Regional Commander of western parts of North America

Stationed in Los Angeles, Ramirez is the youngest wizard of the White Council to ever be promoted to regional commander, given the job due to the severe casualties of war with the Red Court. While still young by wizarding standards, Ramirez possesses formidable combat skills honed during the war, which compensates for a relative lack of raw power compared to some of his compatriots. Generally displaying a cocky and confident demeanor, Ramirez is, at heart, deeply courageous and loyal to his friends. While smooth-talking and obsessed with women, it was rather ironically revealed during the events of White Night that Ramirez is still a virgin.

In battle he heavily favors water magic and conventional weaponry; he has on more than one occasion used grenades and firearms instead of his magic in order to conserve his strength. His principal magical weapon is the use of a type of emerald green energy which seems to break down materials into more component pieces, although on organic matter it seems to work as a desiccant, removing all traces of moisture from the area it hits, turning it into a form of sand. His defensive magic consists of a jelly-like shield that allows incoming projectiles to pass through, but uses their own kinetic energy to break them down into small harmless particles.

Like Harry, Ramirez has guessed the existence of the Black Council (his original name for them being "the Black Hats"). He and Harry consider each other to be good friends and hold each other in considerable respect. Ramirez regards Harry's power level with some awe and has often later referred to some impressive feat of magic that Harry performed with great admiration. In Changes, Ramirez led a team of Wardens to confront Cristos, resulting in the capture and arrest of all members of the team except one (Warden Chandler). In Ghost Story, it appears that he is still functioning for the White Council as Murphy talks about calling Ramirez. In Cold Days, it is reported that he is recovering from an unidentified serious injury, which was caused by a chupacabra, and made worse by Molly in the short story, Cold Case.

Ramirez is a recurring presence in Peace Talks, now serving as a Senior Warder in charge of his own team during the convention of great powers. He is still recovering from his injuries and walks with a limp, and still seems to trust Harry, but the nature of his position means that he requires proof that Harry, trapped in multiple bad situations, is unwilling to provide. Nevertheless, his overall demeanor of trustworthiness and duty remain untouched by his travails.

Susan Rodriguez
Species: Originally human, later Red Court half-vampire (deceased)
Description: Former reporter for The Arcane, Dresden's ex-girlfriend, agent for the Fellowship of Saint Giles

Susan was a reporter who covered supernatural events for The Midwestern Arcane tabloid newspaper. She began soliciting Harry for information on wizards and odd occurrences in Chicago. The two began a romantic relationship in Fool Moon that unofficially ended when Susan was bitten (with intent to turn as well as feed rather than the usual just feeding) by Bianca in the third book Grave Peril. Susan was a half-vampire (and remained so until she was overwhelmed by her emotions and urges resulting in the death of a human), with enhanced strength, speed, recovery abilities, night vision, and narcotic saliva (a Red Court vampire's self-titled 'Kiss'). This however will haunt her for the rest of her life as there is no magic or science known to man that can reverse the condition, even with Bianca's death. In Changes, the Leanansidhe forces Susan to sleep by making her inner predator dormant, and offers to bargain with Harry for her knowledge, which he declines.

Harry had been having trouble saying "I love you" to Susan, and only blurted it out when she went into vampiric bloodlust. Susan recovered somewhat after hearing that. She was captured by Bianca and used as a hostage, but was rescued by Harry. She leaves Chicago, and is asked by Harry to marry him. She refuses due to the dangers of her half-vampiric nature (causing her to have trouble separating her lust for blood from other feelings), although she still loves him.

She joined the Fellowship of St. Giles, an organization for those who have been harmed by vampires, who carved a magical binding/tattoo into her skin. The binding warns her by changing colors when she approaches the limits of her control and cover her entire body. Harry and Susan officially parted ways after the events of Death Masks. As of White Night, Susan is still in South America working against the Red Court as a member of the Fellowship. Lara Raith is astonished that Susan's true love for him is making him toxic to White Court vampires even after being separated for 2–3 years, meaning he hasn't slept with anyone else since as White vampires are beings that feed on lust, and love is the positive opposite of lust and therefore poisonous to them, but this protection will only last until he has loveless sex with someone else.

Susan returns in Changes, surprising Harry with the news that they have a daughter, Maggie. She kept Maggie's existence a secret from Harry and placed her with a foster family in order to protect her and give her a chance at a normal life. Maggie, now eight years old, has been kidnapped by the Red Court to be sacrificed in a powerful blood curse that will kill every living member of her bloodline, including Ebenezar McCoy (Harry's grandfather). As the ritual is about to begin, Susan's colleague Martin apparently reveals himself as a traitor to the Order and causes her to lose control of her vampiric nature, as part of his secret plan to strike at the Red Court. Martin tricks her into giving in to her blood lust killing him and becomes the youngest full Red Court vampire. Harry then kills her on the sacrificial altar, triggering the Red Court's powerful bloodline curse against the Red Court themselves and wiping out every Red Court vampire older than Susan. The majority of Red Court vampire victims in St. Giles became fully human, but having had drastically extended lifespans, most of them immediately died. In any case, even if a few young Red Court vampires remain they are too young, weak, and inexperienced to hold the Red Court's position in the monster hierarchy leaving a void eager to be filled by others. All the powerful and ancient ones were killed by the Bloodline curse. The Leanansidhe promises to treat Susan's body with respect and honor, and to take Harry to her burial site whenever he wishes.

Susan is only present in one episode of the television series adaptation of the books, the episode "Storm Front". She is portrayed by Rebecca McFarland and is somewhat different from the Susan of the novels. She is blonde, rather than Hispanic in appearance, and is a reporter for a mainstream publication. She is shocked to discover magic and demons are real, rather than trying to uncover their existence as part of her job.

Sanya
Species: Human
Description: Knight of the Cross

Harry first meets Sanya in Death Masks when all three Knights arrive to fend off the Denarian Ursiel. Sanya, a Russian of African lineage and a descendant of Saladin, carries the saber Esperacchius. He is a former member of the Order of the Blackened Denarius; when he was 16, he accepted the coin of the fallen angel Magog, out of a desire to strike back at the Russian society that considered him an outcast. Over the next five years, he became the lover of Rosanna, Polonius Lartessa's lieutenant and the one who recruited him into the Order. However, after learning that Rosanna did not care about him, he threw his coin away and was found by Shiro, who took him to meet the archangel Michael. Sanya accepted Michael's offer to become a Knight and took up Esperacchius. Although he deals with supernatural and angelic/demonic creatures on a regular basis, he considers himself an agnostic and says that he fights for the good of society, fitting his devout socialist (Trotskyist) nature.

As of the end of Small Favor, he is the only Knight still on active duty, with Shiro dead and Michael Carpenter badly injured. He admits to Harry that bearers for their swords must be found before he is overwhelmed. This remains the case until the end of Skin Game, when Waldo Butters takes up Shiro's sword and becomes a Knight.

Sanya makes an appearance in Changes, saving Harry's upstairs neighbors, the Willoughbys, when the boarding house is set on fire. He also joins Harry's attack party against the Red Court at Chichén Itzá. In Skin Game, Sanya is said to be seen fighting several Denarians in Iran, drawn there by the Order to prevent him from interfering in Nicodemus' plan.

The Senior Council
The seven wizards who act as the leaders of the White Council. The Senior Council currently consists of:

Gregori Cristos
Species: Human
Description: Senior council member

A man of Greek origin who has spent most of the last couple centuries in Asia, appointed to the council after LaFortier's death. Described by McCoy as "an unpleasant bastard", he was still LaFortier's protégé. He was not next in line for the position but received it by threatening to secede from the council with his many followers. While other motives are possible, Harry and McCoy believe that he is a member or a tool of the Black Council and that LaFortier was murdered to allow Cristos to get on the Senior Council.

In Changes Cristos is revealed to be an ally of Arianna Ortega, and is attempting to make peace between the Red vampires and the council. He has little trust or influence among the Senior Council; during the meeting with Arianna, he and McCoy were the only Senior Council present, although he wasn't informed of it for security reasons. His influence is among the wizards of more underdeveloped nations and countries, who've long felt left out of Council power.

Aleron LaFortier
Species: Human
Description: Former Senior Council member (deceased)

A French wizard and a minor character in the series. He is described as skull-faced and skeletally thin. LaFortier gets his political clout from the less well represented countries on the council. His supporters come from small countries in Africa and Southeast Asia. They believe that it is only LaFortier that listens to them. LaFortier voted against Harry when the White Council offered peace with the Red Court in exchange for his life and Harry believes he was the first member of the Senior Council to vote for his execution after the death of DuMorne. LaFortier has generally shown a continual antipathy toward Harry. In Turn Coat LaFortier is murdered by Anastasia Luccio, under the mental influence of Samuel Peabody, although Morgan is the one accused of the crime. He is replaced on the Senior Council by his protege, Cristos.

Arthur Langtry (the Merlin)
Species: Human
Description: Leader of the White Council

Langtry is a powerful wizard of British origin. According to Jim Butcher, Arthur was brought up during the time of the British Empire and is old enough to remember when the United States were colonies. In addition to being a master of wards (defensive magic), he also has centuries of experience in the political arena that make him a formidable opponent both in and out of Council session. He is generally a fair and competent leader, but he does not take kindly to being crossed or thwarted, especially by those he considers his juniors (which, given his age and position, includes almost everyone). Harry's assessment of Langtry is one of respect for the position of Merlin and ability as a Wizard, as Harry puts it, "you don't get to be Merlin of the White Council by collecting bottle caps". He is, quite simply, the most powerful and capable Wizard on the planet. The respect Harry shows only goes so far as Harry still sees him as a bully.

He is much like Morgan in personality, as he believes that one mistake tarnishes a person forever, and that a violation of the Seven Laws of Magic even in self-defense should be punishable by instant death. He hopes that Harry Dresden will slip up so that he will be subject to punishment from the Council, which often means execution. His personal hatred of Harry leads him to stretch the rights of wizards, in hopes of ending the conflict with the Red Court.

In the events of Turn Coat, his dislike of Harry has even led to him developing nervous tics when Harry jokes around. However, he will side with Harry when matters are important enough to him. Also, Harry finally sees a demonstration of the Merlin's abilities when he simultaneously calms down a room of chaos while engaging and coordinating the containment of a dangerous mistfiend.

In Changes, he encounters Harry again, and Harry sees him for the first time armed for combat in sort of a sorcerer's utility belt. He is not taken in by the peace offering of the Red Court, and is merely gathering energy for the inevitable counterstrike. His political awareness is proved once again.

Martha Liberty
Species: Human
Description: Senior Council member

An African-American wizard, and another relatively minor character as of Proven Guilty. She is an extremely tall black woman with gray hair and a stern manner, who dislikes being addressed as "Matty" and tends to address others very formally. Her age is unknown, and she apparently lives with some of her descendants (who know about her being a wizard) whom she vets for wizard potential.

Initially she is against Harry, calling him "arrogant, dangerous" and citing his lack of respect for the White Council. Yet, after hearing Ebenezar's defense and noting that Harry has his mother's eyes, she agrees to support him with her vote.

Martha is one of the members of the Senior Council present during the Peace Talks.

Joseph Listens-to-Wind (AKA "Injun Joe")
Species: Human
Description: Senior Council member

While not a Native American shaman, he is the only "real American" on the council (he refers to McCoy and Liberty as "a bunch of Johnny-come-latelies"). He is often accompanied by his familiar, a raccoon named Little Brother, and seems to be in communication with other animals, since he is acquainted with Tera West, the wolf-woman introduced in Fool Moon. Little Brother seems to get along with Harry after he gave the familiar a Snickers candy bar he found in his pocket. He is known to be the best at healing of the entire Council, even keeping up on modern medicine by going to college every once in a while to brush up.

Listens-to-Wind is a kind, gentle man with a generous outlook, and apparently likes Harry's spirit and sharp tongue, and takes his nickname, bestowed by McCoy, with good humor: "Ignorant redneck hillbilly doesn't read and doesn't know he can't call me that. Now I'm Native American Joe". When the council is voting whether to hand Harry over to the Red Court, he votes in Harry's favor.

Later, in Turn Coat, he takes charge during the investigation of LaFortier's murder and refuses to help Harry, saying that a death is needed, even if it is the death of an innocent, good, and valuable man like Morgan. He tells Harry that his tribe was wiped out because he refused to break Council Law and become involved. As the Council members come from so many different nationalities, that there will always be Wizards on both sides of any issue. The Council frowns on political involvement, as it would tear them apart. It is possible that his less than ethical view of sacrificing Morgan could have been due to Peabody's influence. His regret for having to sentence Morgan to death knowing his innocence was certainly great.

During a fight with the skinwalker in Turn Coat, Listens-to-Wind shows he can smoothly and very quickly transform into a variety of animals, including a bear, a raven, a turtle and a coyote. He also is able to counter some of the magic that the skinwalker performs. Prior to fighting the skinwalker, he tosses a few choice insults saying that "Father says you're ugly" (after listening to a thunderous sky) and "Mother says you have no place here" (after sifting and sniffing soil in his hands). Listens-to-Wind is stated not to be a shaman of his tribe with the ability to banish the skinwalker (as spoken by the nagloshii) and doesn't seem to care, telling the skinwalker "Don't plan to bind or banish you, old ghost. Just gonna kick your ass up around your ears. Let's go".

In Changes, he becomes infected by a sickness probably created by the Red Court to cripple the White Council. He is not in Ghost Story, Cold Days or Skin Game.

During the Peace Talks, Listens-to-Wind is revealed to have regular contacts with the Sky and River people, and he convinced them to send an envoy to the meeting and join the Accords. He is also in attendance there, along with most of the Senior Council who support Harry.

Ancient Mai
Species: Human
Description: Senior Council member

An elderly Asian woman. She appears to handle contact with other supernatural powers for the council, having sent emissaries to both Sidhe courts at the start of Summer Knight. She, along with the Merlin, is suspected of being the traitor among the council, as her whereabouts during many of the attacks are unaccounted for.

She does not trust Harry, citing his dangerous attitude, and she voted against him when the Council deliberated on whether to give him to the Red Court. In Turn Coat she tries to have him arrested repeatedly (for the crime of harboring a fugitive, of which he was guilty) and is angered when Ebenezar and Injun Joe refuse. She is described as being of unclear age, with granite colored hair, "rheumy" eyes and being very creepy and scary.

In the television adaptation, Ancient Mai has mostly been portrayed by Elizabeth Thai for the majority of the character's appearance, although she was not the performer in the character's original appearance. She is much younger appearing than in the books and seems to have the hostility towards Harry that Morgan does in the books. It is implied in the episode "Things that Go Bump" that the television version of Ancient Mai is really a renegade dragon who, for yet unrevealed reasons, has abandoned or been forced out of her race's realm, and "she" forms or at least monitors the magical beings in the Chicago area as the de facto leading member of the High Council. It has not been revealed, in the reality of the television series, if Mai is actually the leader of the High Council or if she is merely implied to be the leader from what Harry has been told and allowed to learn about her, nor have her reasons for being part of the High Council been revealed. Due to the cancellation of the television series, they likely never will.

Ebenezar McCoy
Species: Human
Description: Senior Council member, Blackstaff of the White Council, Grandfather to Harry Dresden.

An extremely powerful wizard, McCoy is Scottish, by way of Missouri, and has been active in North America since the French and Indian War. Listens-to-Wind often refers to McCoy as the "old, fat, Hillbilly" as a comeback for the "Injun Joe" moniker McCoy slapped on him in fun. In addition to his duties as a member of the Senior Council, McCoy also serves covertly as the council's Blackstaff, giving him the authority to break any of the wizarding laws as he deems necessary without consulting the council. He has served as the Blackstaff for at least two hundred years, claiming responsibility for, among other things, the New Madrid earthquake of 1812, the Krakatoa eruptions of 1883 and the Tunguska Event of 1908. During the events of Death Masks, McCoy pulled a satellite out of orbit to destroy the stronghold of a Red Court Duke.

Ebenezar was Harry's mentor for a long period of time after Justin DuMorne (although it was later revealed that Harry was originally placed with McCoy so that the older man could deal with him permanently should it become necessary), and often serves as Harry's translator during Council meetings (which are conducted in Latin). He refused a position on the Senior Council on several occasions, but finally agreed in order to help thwart a plot against Harry. Ebenezar often offers Harry his help, in one case even offering sanctuary at his farm in Hog Hollow, Missouri. The revelation of his status as the Blackstaff caused a temporary rift between Harry and Ebenezar, but this was ultimately mended after the events of Proven Guilty.

He has a long-standing unspecified disagreement with the Merlin, which has not been explored deeply within the series, but in Turn Coat they have known each other since McCoy was sixteen.

It has been revealed that he mentored Harry's mother as well, and feels considerable guilt for having pushed her too hard and losing her to the other side.

At the end of the events of Turn Coat, Ebenezar has formed a conspiracy circle, The Grey Council, of his own to unmask the so-called Black Council traitors, recruiting Harry and a number of others to his cause. He is also revealed to be nominating Harry for an important position, although that position is as yet unknown but seems to be related to Harry's connection to Demonreach.

As of Changes, Ebenezar is revealed to have more than a mentor-type interest in Harry's well-being. He is Harry's maternal grandfather, being Harry's mother Margaret LeFay's father.

Ebenezar has not yet realized that Thomas Raith is also his grandson, but Lara revealed that she knew that fact from the beginning when her father and Margaret were together in Peace Talks. Ebenezar and Thomas finally meet face to face, and both show intense animosity towards each other. He continuously asked his grandson why he wanted to help Thomas after his arrest while Harry tries his best not to reveal their connection. When Ebenezar was ready to attack Thomas and Lara on the *Water Beetle* boat, Harry had no choice but to turn his staff towards his mentor. It was then Harry finally confessed that Thomas was his brother and Margaret's son in their fight, but his grandfather was consumed with rage at the revelation and set to attack the boat once again; Harry had to intervene and took the full blast of the magical attack with his body. Ebenezar realized what he had done and tried to explain his action to the dying Harry, who was later revealed to be a fake created from Molly's magic ring.

Ebenezar summons the actual "Blackstaff" out of thin air. Harry comments that it seems "alive", and even more so after its use to destroy hundreds of lives seems happy to carry out murder. As a side effect of said murder, the staff oozes suspicious black tendrils or veins that wrap around McCoy's arm, but are stopped by his will; a possible suggestion that "Blackstaff" is indeed an entity, and either takes an additional toll on (or seeks to control) its wielder.

Ebenezar's true skill at wizardry and power are on full display in Peace Talks. His full panoply of skills, knowledge, and experience are far superior to Harry in all categories, proving that age truly is power among wizards. However, his hatreds are set in stone, and his stubbornness and inability to move past them endangers his whole family and relationship with Harry with how he wants to deal with the situation of Harry's daughter... and his murderous rage at finding out he has a White Court grandson drives him completely out of control, to the point where he actually unleashes a killing blow upon Harry. At the end of Battle Ground, Harry is expelled from the White Council and given a suspended death sentence, with McCoy ordered to execute him if he commits any further offenses. If McCoy refuses to carry out that order, he himself will be found guilty of treason.

Simon Petrovich
Species: Human
Description: Former Senior Council member (deceased)

A Russian who was only mentioned in Summer Knight. He was described as an expert upon vampires and sort of an emissary to them. It was also stated that the vampires trusted him. Simon was killed in the Red Court assault upon his anti vampire training compound at Archangel. Supposedly his death curse destroyed what remained of the vampire forces and he was apparently quite powerful. He was the mentor of Harry's first teacher, Justin DuMorne.

Rashid, the Gatekeeper
Species: Human
Description: Senior Council member, Gatekeeper of the White Council

A tall, mysterious wizard on the Senior Council who typically dresses in a full head-to-toe cloak with a hood that shadows his face. He is described as being Middle Eastern, but with elements of a British accent, suggesting he was either an Arab immigrant to England, or lived during the British control of Iraq and Palestine under their League mandate. Not much is known about the Gatekeeper other than his name, which is rarely used, with his title generally being used in its stead. It is strongly suggested in Proven Guilty that he has the capability to view future events in some manner, but he can only reveal this to others in the vaguest terms, to prevent any possible violation of the Sixth Law of Magic. He is a Muslim (revealed when he invokes the name of Allah in Summer Knight), has more of a sense of humor than some of his contemporaries on the Senior Council, and appears willing to go behind their backs to some extent if he feels it necessary. Queen Mab refers to Rashid as "that old desert fox", suggesting a degree of respect for the Gatekeeper.

Harry gets a closer look at the Gatekeeper in Turn Coat establishing that he has a horrible burn down the side of his face, and a metallic eye that apparently can see a person's future. He hints that Harry has some important future events to shape. However, he is not able to see only one future, but several. Also, while the events on Demonreach unfold, Rashid reveals that he and the island's entity have a long-standing argument, indicated when Harry asked why he wouldn't set foot on the island by Rashid saying, "Because this place holds a grudge". It is suggested that he is the one that gave the island's spirit avatar its limp. Jim Butcher later clarified that Harry's assumption was incorrect, and the limp was caused by the last ice age.

In Cold Days it is revealed that the Rashid's title of Gatekeeper is due to his role as guardian of the Outer Gates, enormous crystalline-looking structures the size of apartment buildings that keep out hordes of Outsiders. Rashid's eye is revealed to be constructed of the same material, rather than steel; when Harry saw it before, its true appearance was veiled.

Faerie Courts

Mother Winter and Mother Summer
Species: High Sidhe
Description: Senior Queens of the Winter and Summer Courts

The oldest of the Faerie Queens, they are understood to be easily the two most powerful living Faeries. In Mortal Lore they are known as Gaea (Summer) and Baba Yaga (Winter). Elaine states that "they can kill with just a stray thought". Unlike other faeries, they seem to be able to use iron and steel objects without discomfort, as evidenced when Mother Winter threw a steel cleaver at Harry's head. They reside together in a small hidden cabin somewhere in the hills of the Nevernever. The events in Summer Knight led Harry to their house in order for him to talk to them.

Depending upon the season, one of the two is active and the other is inactive. When Harry arrived, at the last day of Summer's power, Mother Winter sat in a rocking chair, knitting, and Mother Summer was up, bustling about.

The Mothers are actually the birth-mothers of the two Queens - Mother Winter is Mab's mother and Mother Summer is Titania's mother.

In Cold Days, Harry summons Mother Winter in an attempt to find out details about the conflict between Mab and Maeve, and barely avoids being killed by a meat cleaver when she appears. His defiance satisfies her, and she brings him to Mother Summer, who in turn takes him to see the ongoing battle between the Outsiders and Winter Sidhe at the Outer Gates.

The two Mothers, along with angels and other powerful beings, are supposed to have the ability of Intellectus: a limited form of inherent omniscience; the domain to which the Intellectus applies varies depending on the being - for example, Demonreach's Intellectus is limited to knowledge of the island it inhabits.

Winter Court

Queen Mab
Species: High Sidhe
Description: Queen of the Winter Sidhe

Also known as the Queen of Air and Darkness, Mab is easily one of the most powerful beings currently encountered in the books. The daughter of Mother Winter and the mother of Maeve, Mab has demonstrated her immense power both by performing great feats of magic with little or no effort and in her ways of punishing those who have dishonored her. She displays enormous cruelty in this respect, leaving the victim of her scorn literally begging for death.

First introduced in Summer Knight, she reveals that she now 'owns' Harry's debt to the Winter Fae. When the Leanansidhe returned to the Winter Court with a powerful athame, Mab forced her to sell Harry's debt contract to her to keep the balance in the court. In Dead Beat Mab was shown to have the athame, which she now possesses because she locked the Leanansidhe away for a time until she could be shown to have thrown off the corruptive influence the tainted gift had had upon her.

As of Proven Guilty, both Lily and Maeve have expressed a concern that she is going insane. In Small Favor she does not speak for herself during most of the book but instead uses the Grimalkin, a huge cat-like creature of the Fae, as her "voice". When she does speak, it is described as razor sharp and shakes the area where Harry is, making his nose and ears bleed. Harry at first guesses she's furious because of the attack on Arctis Tor in Proven Guilty. Later in Cold Days, he decides instead that she's furious and hurt at Maeve's corruption by Nemesis and Mab's inability to cure her. Harry also discovers in Cold Days the ancient ongoing war with the Outsiders, which are not only trying to conquer fairie, but the human world as well.

Mab has a strong interest in Harry, and has on numerous occasions throughout the series offered him the title and position of the 'Winter Knight', her personal champion. Despite the great power of the position, Harry has always refused as being Winter Knight would make him bound to her every command, a slave to Mab for the remainder of his mortal life. However, in Changes, Harry finally accepts Mab's offer to become Winter Knight, in exchange for healing and power enough to save his daughter. Despite Harry's attempt to end his own life to prevent what he sees as his inevitable corruption, by arranging his own assassination with Kincaid, Mab, working in conjunction with the Demonreach entity, preserves and repairs his body until his spirit can rejoin it, ensuring that his tenure as Winter Knight continues. With Uriel's help, Harry comes to realize that Mab can only corrupt him if he allows her to, that his soul remains his own, and thus he informs Mab that, while he will honor his debt and serve as her Knight, he will do it his way and on his own terms. If she tries to 'change' him, even in a minor way, he'll become the most high maintenance, 'mediocre' knight in history. Once Harry's service to her begins in earnest in Cold Days, she expresses her affection for Harry by repeatedly trying to kill him as part of his physical therapy. Mab is terrifyingly capricious, extremely cunning and intelligent, makes a multitude of plans to accomplish something based on circumstances rather than relying on a single plan, but thus far finds Harry's defiance and determination to retain his soul pleasing.

Mab's terrifying political acumen and ruthlessly manipulative cunning are on full display in Skin Game. The entire novel is about her gaining revenge on Nicodemus for betraying and then leaving Accords that she drafted. She forces Harry to work with his archenemy by artfully removing all his other options ahead of time; has Nicodemus come to her to gain Harry's services in paying off an old debt; and gives Nicodemus the very idea of breaking into the vault of Hades just so he will murder his own daughter to do so, whilst convincing Marcone to set up the Vault for Nicodemus to break into specifically to make the link into Hades' vault to enact his own vengeance for his torture at Nicodemus' hands ... and Hades to go along with it by being Marcone's first depositor. Furthermore, the idea that Nicodemus' daughter would not be judged by Heaven and so be free of punishment is completely voided by the fact that Hades takes his role as judge of the dead very seriously. Nicodemus merely told his daughter she would be safe from "the Enemy" if her soul were left in Hades' keeping, and did not explicitly reference the forces of Heaven, leaving his ultimate meaning somewhat uncertain.

A number of events in Peace Talks occur around Mab. First, it is revealed that her signature on the Accords is actually the force that keeps it most intact. The assault on her by the Fomor nearly breaks the resolve of the Accorded Forces. Favors to Lara from her force Harry into his primary role of rescuing Thomas during the middle of the convention, and a massive attack on the Outer Gates at the same time the Fomor are planning to strike mean that her forces will not be available for that battle.

Maeve
Species: High Sidhe
Description: Lady of the Winter Sidhe (deceased)

She is the youngest of the Winter Queens. She was first introduced in Summer Knight as a conceited, wanton, capricious and manipulative girl, much like the rest of the Winter Court. However, Elaine says that this playgirl persona is a ruse, with a much colder and more calculating personality underneath. This insinuation of Elaine's was made while she was actively engaged in helping conceal the true murderer of the Summer Knight, and should be taken with a grain of salt. In Proven Guilty, she expresses concerns about Mab's sanity and works with the Summer Lady to assist Harry in his assault on Winter's stronghold. Later, in Cold Days, it's revealed that Maeve is the one who is corrupted.

Although strong, Harry describes her magic as "sloppy"; in Summer Knight, she seems to exhaust herself subduing her own knight. Some of the energy she wields spills out of the spell, lowering the ambient temperature.

She is described as an attractive "young" woman. Her most striking feature-besides those normal to the Fae-is her hair: dreadlocks dyed in different shades of pale blue, green, and purple to imitate the colors found in a glacier. Personality is that of a sadistic, spoiled rich (in power if not money) girl who manages as few responsibilities as possible, feels undervalued (mainly in her own head) by her mother Mab, and enjoys a little chaos and anarchy as long as she remains the most powerful entity in the room.

Maeve continues to put up a front of a "ditzy" persona throughout the series. She appears on several fronts, always wearing revealing clothing (including a T-shirt that says 'your boyfriend wants me') and her best 'come hither' look. Harry's allies all seem to see right through her and are very wary whenever she is present. Harry begins to develop the same guarded attitude about her but outwardly still treats her with contempt.

Harry's first task as Winter Knight in Cold Days is to kill Maeve. This is necessary because she has been infected by a malevolent entity known as "Nemesis". Mab would rather cleanse Maeve in the Fountain of the Winter Court, but it only works if Maeve wants to be cleansed. As a result, Maeve not only is able to lie to others, but to herself as well. Thus she lies to herself that Mab doesn't love her, wants her dead, and decides to help "Nemesis". This is a direct betrayal of her role as the Winter Lady who is supposed to help the Winter Queen with the millennia old ongoing fight to prevent "Nemesis" from invading not only fairie, but the human world as well. Murphy shoots her during the dramatic confrontation on Demonreach, and Molly, being the closest potential candidate, replaces her as the Winter Lady.

Lloyd Slate
Species: Human
Description: Former Winter Knight (deceased)

Slate was hired to the Winter Court by Maeve, Winter Lady.  He despised her because of her dominating, cruel attitude. He was a heroin addict, rapist, and murderer. His weapon was a Japanese-style sword whose tang is not quite that of a genuine katana (possibly an O~Wakizashi).

Lloyd is one of the main antagonists in Summer Knight. He was a traitor to the Winter Court and tried to help Lady Aurora kill Lily. He was carried away by Maeve, Mab, and Mother Winter, screaming for help. As of Proven Guilty, he is imprisoned in Arctis Tor, Mab's fortress in the heart of Winter, suspended on an icy tree in a crucifixion state by thick sheets of ice. Lea tells Harry that he nears the brink of death due to starvation and frostbite, but Mab "tortures him with kindness" by healing his wounds, restoring his sight, feeding him, and allowing him to sleep in her bed (sex is also implied). When he next wakes up, he is once again hanging on the tree, blinded. Lea believes that when his mind has started enjoying the care despite knowing what comes next he is then returned to the tree, thus restarting the cycle of Mab taking care of him and torturing him, stating that "he only lives so long as he resists". However, in Small Favor Mab tells Harry that he will only be free to die when he is replaced, which finally happens in Changes when Harry kills him in order to take up the mantle of Winter Knight.

Cat Sith
Species: Fae, Greater Malk, from legendary Cat Sìth
Description: Former aide to Harry Dresden, Winter Knight

Cat Sith is introduced in Chapter 2 of Cold Days and is described as a larger than average Malk, the size of a young mountain lion, with all black fur and a single white spot in the middle of his chest. After Dresden treats him like a usual Malk, he reads Cat Sith's aura and dispenses with the contemptuous treatment, realizing Cat Sith has great power. Cat Sith is assigned to Harry as his "batman" or his aide. As Cat Sith puts it, managing Dresden's incompetence. He shows the typically catlike playful contempt for Dresden and expresses several times a desire to kill Harry because he "will enjoy it, and you annoy me", although it's unlikely that he would actually do so. Cat Sith's shadow is the size of a highway sign billboard and he radiates great power. He does offer Harry good advice including warning him not to turn his back on anyone because he "is of Winter now". Sith acquires a car for Harry, and proves a capable ally despite his arrogant attitude. During Cold Days Sith is infected by the Nemesis, attacking Harry and forcing him to throw Cat Sith into Lake Michigan.

Jenny Greenteeth
Species: Fae (deceased)
Description: Servant to Maeve

Jenny Greenteeth was a Faerie of the winter court with a knack for tempting weak minded men. She served as an agent to Maeve. In Summer Knight Maeve offers her to Harry, insisting the price of information from her is to impregnate Jenny. Harry seriously considered it until his brain kicked in and he dumped cold ice water down his pants. After the water had its intended effect Harry raised his voice to Maeve and denied her the desired payment. This angered the scorned Jenny, and she retaliated against Harry in the short story "Something Borrowed" by kidnapping Georgia so that she could marry and kill Billy, whom she remembered as having accompanied Harry to his meeting with Maeve. She put Georgia in a comatose state in Undertown and surrounded her with crab-like servants, the Shellycobs. Harry and Murphy managed to save Georgia before Jenny could marry Billy. The spell that she placed on Georgia could only be broken by true love's kiss, supplied by Billy during Harry's disruption of the wedding. Once Georgia was freed, she and Billy transformed and brutally mauled Jenny. She could take many forms but her preferred glamour was that of a very attractive, slender young girl with emerald green hair and metallic green teeth.

Lacuna
Species: Fae (Little Folk)
Description: Member of the Winter Court

Lacuna is a small fairy, about the size of Toot-toot who follows the bidding of Ace, the changeling from Summer Knight. Lacuna is first seen wearing all black armor covered in hooks for which she earns the name "Captain Hook" from Harry. After being captured by Harry and his friends, she claims Winter Law as Harry's prisoner and becomes, in essence, his ward/vassal/possession. She differs from other Small Folk in that she doesn't like pizza or other junk food, instead preferring celery and other healthy items. She answers all of Harry's questions and follows his orders, as dictated by Winter Law, and seems to have little patience for what she refers to as "stupidity" meaning anyone other than her and anything said not taken literally. Toot-Toot seems to have fallen instantly in love with her though she returns his affection with nothing but scorn.

The Leanansidhe
Species: High Sidhe
Description: Noble, Winter Court of the Sidhe

The Leanansidhe, or Lea, is Dresden's faerie godmother. He was under her debt before she sold his debt to Queen Mab. She often aids Harry and keeps him alive in exchange for future favors. She was a captive of Queen Mab who was sentenced to spend an undefined amount of time at the heart of Arctis Tor frozen as a statue within the Fountain of Winter until she has been "humbled", having returned to the court with too much power and trying to overthrow Mab. At the time it seemed that she is possessed by something, as her character rapidly changes during her conversation with Harry. After being cleansed she doesn't seem to have the same murderous grudge that most Winter Fae have for Harry after he introduced Summer fire to the Winter wellspring, but in Cold Days she was infected with "Nemesis" through the Red Court's gift of an athame and in turn infected Maeve.

Although warped by human standards, she seems truly to care about Harry, even if her thoughts on "caring" for him happened to concern Harry spending time as one of her hounds (her reasoning being that, as a hound, Harry would be safe and happy in her care). She has also made references to a deal made between her and Harry's mother which may be the reason she looks out for Harry. Her personal realm in the Nevernever corresponds with Harry's apartment on Earth, as a protective measure to prevent any attack on her godson by that route.

In Changes, Lea returns having been apparently "cured" by Mab of her "affliction". It is revealed that Lea is the second most powerful member of the Winter Court, second only to Mab herself. After Harry becomes the Winter Knight, Lea is assigned to assist Harry in his efforts to save his daughter, with Mab informing her casually that she may "indulge" herself when Lea asked to what extent she was permitted to help. Lea provides enchanted weapons and armor for Harry and his companions. Lea also begins to show a more respectful attitude towards Harry, possibly as a result of him now wielding Mab's authority as her champion. Lea also shows some interest in Molly during and after the final battle in Changes. She continues to pay close attention to Molly after Harry's death, subjecting her to a painful form of tutelage as part of her obligation, through Mab, to the apprentice of the Winter Knight. The tutelage is painful not because of a sadistic urge, but to teach Molly in a manner that is both lasting, faster, and more informative than Harry's slower, gentler methods. After seeing the results as a ghost he realizes that he's been "babying" Molly in her training resulting in her being less prepared, less capable and less knowledgeable without him.

The historical inspiration for the Leanansidhe is a particular type of faerie who is the inspiration for mortal artists and performers.

Redcap
Species: Fae
Description: Member of the Winter Court

The Redcap is a servant of Maeve's and loyal to her to a fault. He is the subject of the legend of the Redcap. The Redcap is the first to openly challenge Harry at his birthday celebration at the Winter Court by kidnapping Sarissa and threatening her life, and ends up being beaten by him in a fight staged by Harry as a game to win her back. Throughout Cold Days, the Redcap appears with his entourage to harass Harry and make several attempts to kill him. He is the father of Ace, a changeling first appearing in Summer Knight, and cares little for his mortal offspring, deeming him a failure. The Redcap survives the final battle in Cold Days, but loses an eye when Harry slashes his face with claws of Winter Ice. In his first appearance, he is wearing a Cincinnati Reds baseball hat, which Dresden openly mocks, telling Redcap he should have gone with Philadelphia or Boston.

The Redcap appears in Battle Ground, assisting Harry and his allies in setting up defenses for Marcone's stronghold. He reveals to Harry that while serving Maeve, he was secretly feeding information to Mab that allowed her to orchestrate events and set up Maeve to be killed.

Summer Court
In Cold Days, it is revealed that the Summer Court is fighting alongside the Winter Court against "Nemesis" and exists not to oppose the Winter Court in all matters but to balance Winter Court's influence just enough to prevent it from overwhelming the Human world.

Queen Titania
Species: High Sidhe
Description: Queen of the Summer Sidhe

She is the Queen of Summer, daughter of Mother Summer. She is Aurora's mother.

Titania is never actually met face-to face until Cold Days, but appears twice in Summer Knight when viewed by Harry with his Wizard's Sight as she and Mab prepared for battle, and later as she reclaims Aurora's body from the battlefield. She is Mab's equal in power, the only difference in their power being who has control of the Stone Table at the time and who utilizes its power. She holds the title of Lady of Life and Light. She has control of fire as well, much like other beings from Summer. Titania is, in her own words, emotional. She prefers to follow her heart and is not cold and calculating like her sister Mab. Her demonstration of this comes when she informs Harry that she saw what was happening to Aurora and what Aurora was becoming and knew something had to be done. Yet she still says Harry 'murdered' her daughter and for that, she will never forgive him. She does aid him slightly by providing a name of the behind-the-scenes power that's been influencing Harry's life for the past 10 or so years, "Nemesis". She has not spoken to Mab since the Battle of Hastings, indicating almost a millennium of silence between the two Queens.

There is a key moment in Peace Talks when Mab directs the Summer Knight to inform Titania, who is not in attendance, of what has occurred there, because she should know. In Battle Ground, Harry summons her to aid in the battle against Ethniu.

Aurora
Species: High Sidhe (deceased)
Description: Former Lady of the Summer Sidhe

She was the Summer Lady, daughter of Titania. First appearing in Summer Knight, she takes Elaine after she is "wounded" by Lloyd Slate, the Winter Knight. She took care of Elaine, and sat to talk to Harry. He noted her kindness and her gentleness.

However, at a later time in the book, it is discovered that she is the one who kidnapped Lily, turning her into a stone statue which Harry was led to believe as having been 'carved' by one of Aurora's servants. She steals the Unraveling Harry obtained from Mother Winter, and started the War at the Table. She planned to shift the power of the old Summer Knight Ronald Reuel, which had been transferred to Lily, to Winter by killing her on the Table. The power of the Summer Knight would be added to Winter, grossly unbalancing the two Fae Courts ending, what she considered in her infected mind, to be a long, pointless struggle with too many casualties. Harry killed her by unleashing pixies, led by Toot-Toot, armed with plastic - coated box-cutters before she could kill herself on the table. Her mother, Titania, carried her away from the Valley of the Table.

In Cold Days, the reason for Aurora's insane behavior is that she was infected by the Adversary.

Lily
Species: High Sidhe (former changeling - deceased)
Description: Former model, former Lady of the Summer Sidhe

Originally not encountered until the end of Summer Knight, Lily was held captive by Lady Aurora, imprisoned in stone. When Aurora was killed, the power of the Summer Lady was supposed to flow into the nearest Vessel of Summer, which was Lily due to the fact that Aurora designated her as the Summer Knight. She has befriended Harry, but despite their longtime friendship, she is still bound by the rules of the Fae (along with whatever Geas Titania puts on her) and Harry struggles to get her to do things for him or give him information often against the best interests of the Fae. Her first loyalty will be to her court, and she is unlikely to betray them.

In Cold Days, Maeve tricks Lily into helping her free the spirits imprisoned on Demonreach Island by telling her that Dresden has been corrupted and created the place as a giant battery of "evil" power. After the plan fails, Maeve shoots and kills Lily (succeeding because it happened on the one day of the year all Fairie, including Queens, are 'mortal'); the mantle of the Summer Lady then passes to Maeve's twin sister Sarissa.

Sarissa
Species: High Sidhe (former changeling)
Description: Lady of the Summer Sidhe

Maeve's fraternal twin sister and Mab's daughter, she first appears as Harry's physical therapist to help in his rehabilitation. She is bound to Mab, having asked of her a favor. Unlike Maeve, Sarissa has a good relationship with her mother, which makes Maeve hate and envy her. She also hasn't embraced her Fairie side and thus is still part human. At the end of Cold Days, Mab hoped for Sarissa to become the new Winter Lady after Maeve was dead, but only as a last resort if Maeve couldn't be persuaded to be cleansed. However, Maeve learned of Mab's intentions (either didn't or refused to hear the last resort part as Mab would've killed Maeve herself if she really didn't care) and killed Lily, knowing that the Mantle of the Summer Lady would flow into Sarissa, thus thwarting (some of) Mab's plans. Mab had considered the chance that Sarissa wouldn't become the Winter Lady (most likely because of getting killed by either Maeve or her Maeve's minions) and had arranged for Molly to not only be close by, but to qualify as a potential Lady candidate, but she admits that Sarissa was better suited as the Winter Lady and Molly as the Summer Lady. How Sarissa is coping as the Summer Lady or feels about Dresden is unknown.

Sarissa is present during the Peace Talks, and is shown to be much more in command of her position than the previous two Summer Ladies, although it is the Summer Knight who speaks with Titania, not her.

Ronald Reuel
Species: Human (deceased)
Description: Artist/former Summer Knight

Ronald Reuel was the Summer Knight at the beginning of Summer Knight. He was already murdered at the beginning of the story by Aurora. He was an artist local to Chicago who was known to help half-faerie children.

Fix
Species: Human (former changeling)
Description: Summer Knight (current)

He is one of the young changelings (along with close friend Meryl who was killed during the events of Summer Knight) who hired Harry Dresden to find his friend Lily, who had gone missing. When first introduced into the series he was described as being scrawny and nervous looking with spiky hair. As it turned out, Lily was imprisoned by Lady Aurora at the Stone Table. Fix went with Dresden and the Alphas to find Lily and stop Aurora and the war at the Table. During the ensuing struggle, Fix fought and defeated Lloyd Slate with a monkey wrench. Lily then made him the Summer Knight. Since then, he has become a strong individual, helping Harry whenever asked despite what the Courts dictate. Harry and Fix have not always seen eye-to-eye exactly, but Fix always gives aid to Harry in the end. As of Small Favor their friendship has become strained after Fix was sent on behalf of the summer court to tell Harry to give up on his mission for Mab. Fix, fearful of Harry's much stronger magic and uncertain temper, took a gun with him when they talked.

Fix is a major character in Cold Days, appearing to Harry and warning him to back off from the events in Chicago. Out of respect for their shared past, Fix tells Harry he has until noon on Halloween to get out of town. Harry describes Fix as a much more competent and mature man than when they first met, and Fix has genuinely earned Harry's respect. Fix and Harry end up fighting toward the end of the story and, after Harry defeats Fix and then saves his life, Harry manages to convince Fix that Maeve is the cause of their problems as she's infected with the Outsiders' "Nemesis" virus. Fix helps Harry to battle Maeve and ends up stalling her and her minions long enough for Harry to summon Mab. Harry shares his secret of having a daughter with Fix, showing him how much trust he has in the current Summer Knight.

Fix is present during the Peace Talks. He is once again subordinate to the new Summer Queen, but presumably because Sarissa is the daughter of Mab, is the only one there who can actually talk to Titania, as Mab calls upon him to relay the events of the talks to her.

Minor characters

Nicodemus Archleone
Species: Possessed human/Fallen Angel
Description: Leader of the Order of the Blackened Denarius

Also known as "Nicodemus Archleone" (a reference to 1 Peter 5:8), he is the oldest and most powerful of the Denarians. Dresden describes Archleone as "the most dangerous man he has ever met". Archleone is possessed by the fallen angel Anduriel, one of Lucifer's captains. He is a manipulator, murderer, torturer, thief and traitor. In the Dresden Files, the End of Days is not the will of God, as stated in the Bible, but the wish of the other side. Unlike some among his order, he is in full collaboration with his demon; he often appears to be more in control of his actions and comes off as civil and reasonable, a trait he shares with the more powerful mortals amongst the Black Knights, like Rosanna and Tessa. He often looks at long term planning, and his schemes are often elaborate and have multiple purposes. It's stated he has murdered more than a hundred Knights of the Cross, more than a thousand priests, nuns, monks, and three thousand men, women and children directly, and is responsible for the Black Plague and many other acts of chaos and destruction. His past is often obscured and his age is indeterminable, with it being a possibility that he walked the earth when Christ did. The reason for this is that he wisely makes it a point to destroy the Church's records about him every other century.

Nicodemus is married to Tessa/Imariel, the second oldest of the Order. The Archive states that Nicodemus rescued Tessa from a life in the temple of Isis, to whom her parents had sold her at a very young age. They usually do not cooperate; with Nicodemus preferring long-term plans, and Tessa tending more towards the short-term. They have a daughter, Deirdre, who also belongs to the order and appears more loyal to her father than mother.

He rarely appears disconcerted, afraid or panicked, but did seem afraid of Shiro (one of only two Knights of the Cross to face him and survive, and whom he referred to mockingly as "The Jap") during Death Masks. He also tries to push Harry to join his Order during his appearances, seeing him as a worthy recruit. In Small Favor Harry notes he is probably the only person to discover his weakness.

Often his powers seem not to be shape-shifting, as is the norm among the fallen, but his shadow is alive and has substance. Whispering can be heard from it and it is assumed the shadow is actually Anduriel acting independently of himself; like all his order, however, he possesses super human strength and a great deal of magical knowledge. One of the more terrifying possessions he holds is the rope Judas Iscariot used to hang himself with after the crucifixion. While wearing the slender rope as a tie, Nicodemus is invulnerable to attack even by Denarian standards, utterly immune to all methods of death except strangulation with the rope itself. In Death Masks, Harry's realization of this allows him to survive, and in Small Favor Harry chokes him into unconsciousness and continues to hold on, intending to kill Nicodemus, but is interrupted by Deirdre before he can be sure of success. Harry then throws him over the side of a boat and into a lake, where he is swiftly retrieved by his daughter.

Nicodemus' major combat ability is his leadership skills, ability to understand human motivation, and the fact he has had centuries to master all forms of human combat. While not the greatest of human combatants alive, he is surpassed by very few human beings, is kept in top physical shape by his coin, and has millennia of experience in mind games, as well as being completely unscrupulous in his tactics and methods. Shiro of the Knights of the Cross was one of the very rare members of the Order that could actually best him with a sword, and he beats Karrin Murphy in barehanded combat handily. He proved capable of hurling his blade with pinpoint accuracy across a couple dozen yards of space, and is as willing to shoot a man in the middle of a sword duel as exchange blows.

Nicodemus returns to play a major part in Skin Game, where he puts together a team to steal the Holy Grail from Hades's treasure vault. Though Nicodemus is ultimately successful in claiming the Grail, he was required to kill his own daughter, Deirdre, the act of which pains him greatly and drives him furious to the point of insanity when Harry Dresden taunts him with the fact.

Anduriel provides numerous abilities, though he has not yet provided the shapechanging abilities often seen in the Denarians. Anduriel typically manifests as Nicodemus's own shadow moving independently of him. This shadow form can also manifest solidly to attack, hurl or break objects, or even act as wings to allow Nicodemus to fly at speeds matching a freight train. Perhaps his most powerful ability is "to hear anything uttered within reach of any living being's shadow, and sometimes to look out from it and see". He must know to pay attention to a given shadow or it all blends together in the background, and certain locations (such as the Carpenter Household or an awakened Demonreach) are beyond his reach, and this ability can be blocked by certain powerful beings such as Mab, the Queen of Air and Darkness.

At a book signing in Houston, Butcher claimed that in writing Nicodemus, he simply created someone that would be "the flipside of Michael Carpenter".

Hannah Ascher
Species: Human (deceased)
Description: Warlock

Hannah Ascher appears in Skin Game. Wanted by the White Council for killing three men, Hannah Ascher faked her death and joined the Fellowship of St. Giles. She serves as a Warlock on Nicodemus's team, skilled in fire magic. Initially forthcoming on to Dresden, she is turned down by the wizard and Binder. Her allegiance is revealed towards the end of the novel; after the climax of Changes, when the bloodline curse at Chichen Itza eliminates Red Court vampires including those in the Fellowship, Hannah was left alone and joined up with Nicodemus, swearing vengeance on Dresden. She is revealed to be the host for the Fallen Angel Lasciel, who also wants to inflict revenge upon Dresden for spurning her temptation. In the ensuing battle, Ascher is killed when Dresden drops lava on her and the coin is trapped in Hades' Vault.

Mike Atagi
Species: Human
Description: Mechanic

Introduced in Storm Front, Mike Atagi is the only mechanic that can take care of Harry Dresden's car, the Blue Beetle.

Meditrina Bassarid
Species: Maenad
Description: Enchantress/Seductress

In Last Call, she attempts to place a mind-controlling spell over Mac McAnally beer to influence the public at the United Center in Chicago.

Ron Carmichael
Species: Human (deceased, killed by a loup-garou)/ghost
Description: Police Officer (Detective), Murphy's former partner.

Ron Carmichael is introduced in Storm Front as very skeptical of Harry's magical powers and often mocking Harry's abilities by either explaining them away or calling them nonsense. According to both Murphy and Harry, he is a good cop who simply does not believe in the supernatural and prefers to look for rational, logical explanations for everything he encounters. In Fool Moon, he and several other officers are killed by Harley MacFinn, a loup-garou who transforms into a superhuman beast after being arrested.

He reappears in Ghost Story, still working as a detective in his afterlife. He is now described as being younger, slimmer, and better looking than he had been at his death. Carmichael works for a quasi-police detective bureau headed by a spirit he calls "The Captain", who is revealed to be Collin J. "Jack" Murphy, Karrin Murphy's deceased father.

In the television series, the character of Det. Sid Kirmani, portrayed by Raoul Bhaneja, appeared to have been based at least in part on Carmichael. He, like Carmichael, is highly skeptical of Harry's intentions and rejects the idea of magic out of hand. However, he is much younger, thinner and more dapper, and some episodes imply that he is a sloppier detective than his novel counterpart.

Nick Christian
Species: Human
Description: Private detective; Harry's former boss

Nick operates Ragged Angel Investigations, a detective agency located in a broken-down office on the outskirts of gang territory in Chicago. He took Harry on as an apprentice when Harry was starting out as a private detective; after three years, Harry earned his license and opened his own office. In addition to minor jobs on behalf of the police, Nick specializes in cases involving missing children. He is in his fifties, overweight, and an alcoholic, and usually sleeps in his office. During 30 years in business, only seven of his cases have resulted in a child being found alive, but he considers them to be enough justification for the rough times he has faced. He keeps pictures of those seven children on his office wall.

In Ghost Story, Harry enlists Fitz, a disillusioned gang member who can hear him, to help get information from Nick on groups that might be involved in Mortimer Lindquist's abduction. Nick points them toward the Big Hoods, a group that claims no territory and acts more like a religious cult than a gang, and Harry realizes that they may be under a wizard's control as Fitz had been. Nick also refers to a missing-child case that got him and Harry into legal and financial trouble after the parents accused them of kidnapping her. More details of that case are revealed in "A Restoration of Faith", one of the stories in Butcher's anthology Side Jobs.

Demonreach
Species: Nature Spirit
Description: Guardian of a supernatural prison

Demonreach is both a shadowy island in Lake Michigan, many miles offshore from Chicago; and the nature spirit which guards it, and its occupants. The island sits atop one of the strongest dark ley line confluences in the region and is strong enough to empower a Binding Circle mighty enough to constrain the Archive. It first appeared in Small Favor as the site of the climactic battle to retrieve the Archive and crime lord John Marcone from the Denarians. This location is rendered even more important when it is later revealed that the island doesn't merely sit on the ley lines but is the wellspring of their power. The division between island and spirit is blurry.

It is noted that Demonreach is hostile to intruders, human or otherwise, and sits atop a source of great and powerful magic, the spirit operating as protector of the island. The spirit is exceptionally hostile to the Gatekeeper, who will not even set foot upon the island due to a previous altercation. There is a pathway to the Nevernever that opens up on the island, but Harry doesn't know the way yet. The spirit is also extremely hostile towards the presence of the Skinwalker and bars it from approaching the tower and the cabin on the hill. Writings from Ebenezar hint that Demonreach may play a powerful role in Harry's future.

The history of both island and spirit is veiled by its intent to protect and guard itself and its surroundings. Being something other than human it has its own concept of justifiable means in order to keep other entities (including humans and fairies) away. As such, its main concern is to keep intruders off and itself safe from attack so it won't hesitate to kill anything that refuses to leave. For example, the magic empowering it wards away mortal minds, makes anyone able to reach the island extremely uncomfortable and feeling as if under a psychic attack, and prevents it from being found on official maps of the region. The attempts to settle it for use as fishing or furring camps and as a lighthouse by anyone too determined or stubborn to ignore the "keep out signs" have ended in their death, disaster, mental breakdown into insanity, and abandonment of the area. Most people who have visited the island for even a short while have nightmares years afterwards about their time there.

Demonreach has two rotting piers and crumbling settlements left over from these attempts, but the largest remainder of former habitation is the half-fallen lighthouse at the island's highest point. The walls of the adjacent cabin were made with the fallen stones. The final conflict in Small Favor occurs in this clearing. The rest of the island is thickly covered in trees and with a moderate amount of animal life. Stone reefs around the island make it dangerous to approach for boats, but Harry and Thomas build a floating dock (humorously nicknamed the "Whatsup Dock") so they can get in and out safely.

In Turn Coat, Harry returns to Demonreach to prepare himself for a dangerous battle with the Skinwalker. He performs a sanctum invocation with a powerful and unfriendly spirit of the island, essentially becoming the shaman of the island, thus earning the name and position of warden for the island. This allows him to draw power from the island as well as giving him access to the spirit's Intellectus, the total awareness of all objects and living things on the island. This also includes anything that has stayed long enough to become part of the island such as knowing exactly how many and where all the nails in the lighthouse are.

By the end of Ghost Story, Demonreach has a protective attitude toward Harry, its custodian. Thus, it preserves his wounded body with Mab's help for six months, until he is ready to return to life. In Cold Days, Demonreach explains that it needed the help of a mysterious parasite to keep Harry's body alive, promising in return not to tell Harry about it.

In Cold Days, the purpose of Demonreach is revealed. The original Merlin created the island as a mystical supermax prison for worst of the worst monsters, "... a prison so hard that half a dozen freaking naagloshii are in minimum security". These monsters are so dangerous and powerful they make the Skinwalker look like a bawling, newborn ant in comparison. However, in addition to being powerful they're immortal as well so executing them would be impossible without extreme, colossal collateral damage (i.e. it would take the power of a few nukes to get it done). Hence the powerful, last resort, defense system that would blow up not only the island but a tremendous chunk of the mainland as well should the prison become too compromised. It is considered that it could devastate a large portion of the American Midwest and possibly Canada. Underneath the island, there are a number of very long tunnels with monsters locked within crystals. The whole novel is about Outsiders attempting to breach the prison, undo the magic that made it, and free all the great evils imprisoned below it. While the spirit was held at bay by two Queens of the Fey Courts and their entourages working together, it was also inferred that on the island, the spirit had the power to capture Mab herself and imprison her if needed. Also, that it has some connection to the Fairy courts is likely, since it didn't take any direct, violent action to drive the Queens off on its own initiative, but it likely wouldn't hesitate if ordered to by the island's warden (currently Dresden).

In Skin Game, Dresden has nicknamed the spirit "Alfred", which is not appreciated. Among other duties, it keeps Dresden's parasite in check.

Malcolm Dresden
Species: Human (deceased)
Description: Stage illusionist

He is Harry Dresden's father. He died of an apparent aneurysm leaving Harry orphaned at the age of 6. The demon Chaunzaggoroth shed doubt on this, however. Malcolm has visited his son in Harry's dreams at odd intervals, at one point to warn Harry about Lasciel and provide some comfort. Malcolm was apparently kept from doing these visits until certain conditions had been met by others.

He is described as looking and talking somewhat like his son, although he seems to have been a little less cynical and jaded.

Justin DuMorne
Species: Human (deceased, killed by Dresden in self-defense)
Description: ex-Warden, Master to Dresden and Elaine, Black Mage, Warlock

Justin adopted both Harry and Elaine when their magic began to manifest. Though his teaching style was often harsh (his method of teaching Harry, at the age of 13, how to create physical shields involved throwing baseballs at him), both Harry and Elaine were trained very well. Justin's preferred language for spell casting was a variation of ancient Egyptian. He attempted to train Harry in the use of this language but Harry consistently failed during its use. While attempting a fire spell, Harry thought to cheat and used a lighter which Justin noticed. This led to a lecture in which Justin told Harry to make magic his own and feel it as a part of him. This led to Harry's faux Latin incantation "Flickum Biccus" to light a fire.

Harry states Justin was a hard man, but fair. There was no psychological torment or long and drawn out punishments after Harry's failures. Justin, when frustrated, would throw a punch or smack followed by a "try it again". Justin also taught Harry and Elaine to communicate mentally and planned to have them bond over time. Harry and Elaine both thought they were being secretive and cheating with their thought communications but in reality, Justin had directed their relationship and subtly encouraged their romance. His ultimate goal was to have two soldiers totally devoted to him and to each other.

Though once part of the White Council and a Warden, Justin became a black wizard at unknown time and for unspecified reasons, and then tried to mentally take control of his apprentices. He managed to enthrall Elaine, but Harry resisted and ran away. DuMorne then sent a demon, an Outsider, to kill him but Harry defeated it. He later went back and killed DuMorne with a fire spell. He was subsequently put on trial for breaking the First Law of Magic, but escaped execution by convincing the Council that it was self-defense. This led to Harry being placed under the Doom of Damocles, the situation in which he appears at the start of the book series.

In the TV adaptation, the character (renamed Justin Morningway) is played by Daniel Kash and is introduced as Harry's uncle (his mother's brother).

The Erlking
Species: Fae (Wild Fae)
Description: Ruler of the Wild Fae

The Erlking is a king of the Wild Fae who first appeared in Dead Beat. Like his Germanic counterpart, he is the leader of the Wild Hunt, a ritualistic hunt in which spectral huntsmen on horseback, accompanied by hounds roam in a certain area, hunting for members or prey. In Changes, he is revealed to have a court of his own, consisting of goblin warriors and advisors. The Erlking generally appears to be a 9 foot tall man in plate armour, wearing a closed helm topped with deer antlers. His face is described as asymmetrical and wild, but possessing a certain striking nobility.

In Dead Beat, he is the subject of a ritual used to instigate a Wild Hunt. A book describing the summoning is sought after by a number of necromancers, intent upon using it along with a necromantic ritual to gain the power of a minor god. Harry summons the Erlking in an attempt to keep him bound and unavailable to lead the hunt until the time for the ritual has passed, but he is ambushed by one of the necromancers and the Erlking set free. When the Erlking launches the Wild Hunt, Thomas gets caught in their path and chooses to join them rather than be hunted. He later keeps this a secret from Harry for some time, as it represents a backslide from his efforts to avoid hurting people.

In Changes, Harry and Susan flee several Red Court vampires through a portal conjured in the Chicago police department. The portal leads them to the Erlking's main hall. Using a slip of the Erlking's tongue as justification, Harry convinces him to spare their life, though the vampires convince the Erlking to force them to a fight.

In Cold Days, a Wild Hunt is summoned by Mab and sets in pursuit of Harry. Harry and Murphy lead them on a wild chase through Chicago's abandoned steel district before confronting the Erlking and Kringle and besting the latter in a straight fight. Having impressed the Erlking, Harry then takes command of the Hunt and leads them into a fight against a number of Outsiders intent upon dismantling the magical prison on the island of Demonreach.

Ferrovax
Species: Dragon
Description: Not stated 

Dragons are semi-divine beings of immense power. Little is known of Ferrovax, described by himself as the oldest and most powerful of his kind. He was present at Bianca's gathering in Grave Peril where his immense power was demonstrated when he nearly killed Harry by uttering a mere portion of Harry's name (using True Name magic). The only reason Harry lived was that Ferrovax lost interest. The dragon did not appeared until his return in Peace Talks, where he participates in the Peace Accords, mostly staying in a staring contest with Vadderung. When the talks are broken by the Fomor he sides with the Accorded Nations.

Marcone's vault in Skin Game is shown to have a vault devoted to Ferrovax.

Father Anthony Forthill
Species: Human
Description: Priest, pastor of St. Mary of the Angels, lawyer when needed

Father Forthill is one of a few members of the Catholic clergy with any knowledge of the supernatural. When he was younger, he and a few other priests helped to kill a vampire. They swore an oath to protect people from the dangers of the supernatural, and he technically continues this oath by blessing holy water for Dresden. Currently, he helps Michael Carpenter whenever he is needed. Before he became a priest, Father Forthill completed law school and passed the bar examination; he does pro bono legal work for members of his congregation.

He is a very kindly, paternal old priest with a generally positive, but realistic outlook, and a generous spirit. He seems extremely fond of Harry, despite Harry's discomfort with religion, and looks on Harry as a slightly warped but essentially good man, whom God looks favorably on. Harry doesn't share his confidence. It is revealed that he has a tattoo called the Eye of Thoth on his arm, due to his aforementioned vampire hunting.

As of the Events of the short story "The Warrior", Father Forthill is revealed to be a member of the Ordo Malleus, the Inquisition of the Catholic Church, a straight descendant of the historical movement, which has shed its historical overt influence and moved now to be an organization solely devoted to aiding and abetting the Knights of the Cross, of which Michael Carpenter is one.

In Changes, he is entrusted with Maggie Dresden, who he passes on to the Carpenter family to be raised and to benefit from the angelic protection they enjoy.

During the events of Ghost Story, Forthill is shown to be part of the Alliance formed to try to keep the peace in Chicago after Dresden's assassination. During that book, he attempts to intercede with a sorcerer, but is badly beaten. Dresden organises his rescue, encountering a guardian angel sent to protect his shade, should Forthill die from his injuries - the angel explains that, after a lifetime of fighting darkness, there are many supernatural beings who would like to take revenge on Forthill's shade and that her presence is to ensure that he reaches his destination safely. In the end, her services are not required as Forthill is rescued and taken to hospital to have his injuries treated.

The Genoskwa

Species: The Forest People
Description: Member of the Underworld-raiding party

Called Blood on his Soul by the Forest People, Genoskwa (the River word for The Path of War) is a rogue member of The Forest People and cousin to River Shoulders. He first appears in Skin Game as a member of the Underworld-raiding party assembled by Nicodemus Archleone in order to steal the real Holy Grail. Described as hairy, muscular, 9 feet tall, he is very surly and consumes several large goats per day. He is crushed while chasing Harry while the wizard is escaping Hades' realm. In Peace Talks River Shoulders tells Harry that Blood on his Soul survived and bears Harry a grudge.

Goodman Grey
Species: Naagloshii-human hybrid
Description: Mercenary; shape-changer

Goodman Grey appears in Skin Game is a member of the Underworld-raiding party assembled by Nicodemus Archleone in order to steal the real Holy Grail. He is the son of a naagloshii father and a human mother, and can perfectly mimic any living creature once he has a sample of its blood, including retina patterns and some level of memories. Nicodemus is greatly embarrassed to learn that Harry has secretly hired Grey as protection during the theft, prior to meeting Nicodemus for this job. Grey works as a mercenary and takes jobs as part of what he calls "paying the Rent", charging Harry one dollar for his services while turning down a share of the diamonds stolen in the raid.

Peace Talks finds Harry calling up Goodman again to serve as a bodyguard for Justine, his brother's girlfriend. Goodman proves very competent at the task, discovering all the forces that are watching her, and acting to keep her safe while Harry rescues his brother.

Hades

Species: God
Description: Olympian God of the Underworld, safe-keeper of extremely powerful weapons

Hades first appears in Skin Game as one of the behind-of-the scenes players involved in the supernatural worlds plots and an ally of Queen Mab in the destruction of Nicodemus Archleone's reputation. He has, however, motivations of his own, since he ensures that Dresden learns that, in addition to the Land of the Dead, the Underworld is also a secure vault for weapons too powerful to be freely available when not needed. The three-headed dog Kerberos is at Hades' side at his meeting with Dresden.

He Who Walks Before
Species: Outsiders
Description: (a being from beyond the Outer Gates)

It appears in Cold Days during the fight in Mac's tavern and later at battle for the control of Demonreach island. Harry refers to this Outsider as "Sharkface" and is advised by Mac not to banter with He Who Walks Before, but to kill him, and quickly. He appears in a vaguely humanoid form wearing a dirty, scrapped cloak which has long strips of cloth that snap like a flag in a fierce wind. The cloak appears to be a part of the Outsider and is used for attacks and defense, allowing the outsider to curl up into a ball and grab objects with the cloak. Like other Outsiders, He Who Walks Before has no respect for The Accords and ignores the neutral ground signage at Mac's pub. During the battle at Demonreach, the Outsider demonstrates a powerful psychic attack ability, convincing Harry, albeit briefly, that Mab is here condemning him for his actions. At the end of Cold Days, Sharkface appears to have been banished back to the Outer Gates.

He Who Walks Behind
Species: Outsiders
Description: (a being from beyond the Outer Gates)

First summoned by Harry's former mentor and dark wizard Justin DuMorne to capture or kill Harry. Dresden somehow managed to escape He Who Walks Behind and kill Justin when the Outsider was dismissed. Resummoned in the novel Blood Rites, He Who Walks Behind is described as a dark presence, a terrifying shadow or mist that creeps up on you unseen and undetected, possibly indicating where it gets its name. He Who Walks Behind states that it has not forgotten Harry and was not officially dismissed at the end of the novel, leaving many to believe that Harry will someday have to confront the Outsider yet again. Harry carries a mark on his soul, visible to the Wizard's Sight, from his encounter with He Who Walks Behind; its effects, if any, are unknown.

Dresden's first encounter with He Who Walks Behind is told in more detail in Ghost Story. While attempting to rob a convenience store for money to survive after escaping Justin DuMorne's attempts to enthrall - and when that failed, kill - Harry, he sees the physical appearance of The Walker as reflected on the screen of an arcade machine (but not actually visible in the store), which he describes as being "more or less humanoid", with proportions including shoulders which are too wide, arms which are too long, and crooked, too-thick legs, and being covered in fur or scales or "some scabrous, fungal amalgamation of both". The Walker attacks Dresden and forces him to run outside the store, and he catches The Walker in an explosion of the store's fuel pumps with a fire spell (fire being as dangerous to immortal beings as mortal beings in the Dresdenverse) in anger after The Walker kills the clerk of the store Dresden was robbing.

Nathan Hendricks
Species: Human (deceased)
Description: Mob enforcer

Hendricks is Marcone's bodyguard, and apparently most trusted lieutenant. Often stoic, Hendricks is very protective of his boss and seems to show a grudging respect of Harry, though still willing to pit himself against the wizard at very little provocation. Harry calls him Cujo in Storm Front and, at least in Harry's mind, the nickname stuck.

Hendricks is a very large man, his physique often compared to that of a linebacker and his size makes most of the weapons he use look as if toys in his hands. Despite the antagonistic tone of his relationship with Harry, Hendricks has at times sided with Harry over others of Marcone's organization, such as in Small Favor. Hendricks has proven to be capably intelligent, in fact is seen working on a thesis in the short story "Even Hand", and has played football in the past. It is also likely that Hendricks has a romantic relationship with Ms. Gard, and he is shown to have a surprising degree of concern for her well-being. While he doesn't approve of killing in general, having apprenticed under Marcone, he does it thoroughly, but may show his discontent by quoting literature.

Hendricks is killed during the events of Battle Ground, leaving Gard badly shaken. After Ethniu and her forces have been routed, a conversation between Harry and Gard reveals that Hendricks' first name is Nathan.

Justine
Species: Human
Description: Girlfriend of Thomas Raith, hostage of the White Court, current assistant to Lara Raith.

Justine's exact origins are unknown, but it is known that Bianca once wanted her as one of her prostitutes, and that Thomas saved her from such a fate. She became his lover and food source, regularly having sex to sustain him at the cost of her own life force. This was especially necessary since Justine lacks the emotional and mental control that most humans have, and experiences wild manic mood swings when Thomas is not nearby to sap away those emotions.

When Thomas suffered a near-fatal injury, Justine chose to risk her own life to feed his incubus Hunger, giving him the nourishment he needed to heal. She appeared to be dead afterwards, but they both pulled back in time to keep her from being killed. However, she lapsed into a catatonic state for a time, remained extremely weak, and her hair went white. Because of her true love for Thomas and his for her, her touch became toxic to him.

Thomas was exiled from the White Court shortly afterwards, and Lara promised to keep Justine safe from all the other vampires. In White Night Justine has been providing Thomas inside information pertaining to the White Court's dealings. She and Thomas are briefly reunited, and have apparently had non-physical contact since then. She also crochets as evidenced by her gift to Thomas in Small Favor.

Justine is injured by the skinwalker in Turn Coat when it invades the Raith mansion. It is hinted at the end that she and Thomas may have become estranged because of his return to the White Court way of life and sexual feedings, but their mutual love is undimmed. When his guilt over Harry's death causes him to slip into self-destructive behaviors in Ghost Story, Justine willingly abandons the protection afforded her by his true love by having sex with her friend Mara, at which point Thomas is free to feed on her again. In Cold Days, Harry learns from Thomas that Justine has become a sort of dietitian for him, bringing him women of different temperaments to feed on as his mood varies.

In Peace Talks, Justine is a crucial figure, as it is discovered that she is pregnant with Thomas' child. Thomas' resultant activities are believed by Harry to be related to some entity threatening her. Promising that he will rescue Thomas, he arranges for Goodman Grey to act as her bodyguard. Near the end of Battle Ground, while taking her to visit Thomas on Demonreach Island, Harry discovers that she has been possessed by the Nemesis, a spirit that identifies itself further as an Outsider called He Who Walks Beside. In order to prevent it from freeing all the creatures imprisoned on Demonreach, Harry summons the island's spirit to hurl it and Justine far from Chicago.

Kirby
Species: Werewolf (human stock, deceased)
Description: Member of the Alphas.

As a member of the Alphas, Kirby is a werewolf.

In Something Borrowed, a bad injury gotten in a fight against a ghoul prevents him from being Billy Borden's best man at the latter's wedding.

In Harry's Day Off, he and Andi need a thorough cleansing to get rid of psychophagic mites.

In Turn Coat, Kirby and Andi were looking for the skinwalker that had spooked Harry. Before Harry could warn them off, they were attacked. Kirby was killed and Andi was seriously injured.

Polonius Lartessa
Species: Possessed human/Fallen Angel
Description: Member of the Order of the Blackened Denarius

More commonly referred to as "Tessa", she is also a leader for the Denarians. As Nicodemus' wife, she and her Denarian, Imariel, are stated as the second-eldest of the Denarians. Generally, she is a rival to her husband, though they do work together to accomplish a similar goal - the last time they were said to have worked together, the Black Plague spread across Europe. She chooses bearers for coins based upon willingness to take a coin, not talent. Michael said that Fallen who serve Imariel (and Tessa) go through bearers quickly. Tessa is concerned with short-term views, while Nicodemus is focused with the bigger picture and long-term issues. According to Ivy, she is also responsible for the War of the Roses, the Hundred Years War, the Cambodian and Rwandan genocides, and the strife in Colombia. She is also the one who tortured Ivy, demonstrating a highly sadistic personality.

Tessa is also shown to be an exceedingly capable sorceress. She was able to constantly throw lightning around during the ambush with the Archive at the Oceanarium, when most magic was cut off. Harry notes that she is a "big-leaguer" and "White Council material herself".

Lartessa was born in Thessalonica. Her father, greatly in debt because of his failing business, sold her into prostitution at the temple of Isis. She was there from a young age until when Nicodemus found her and offered her a coin, eventually marrying her. The couple have a daughter, Deirdre, who is also Denarian.

At the end of the book, on the island in the middle of Lake Michigan, Tessa and Rosanna had done a major portion of the greater circle to imprison the Archive. Enraged after Michael was shot, Harry sent a "bar of blue-white fire so dense that it was nearly a solid object" straight through Tessa's chest.

Tessa survives this attack and reappears in Skin Game, attempting to foil Nicodemus' plans to rob a high-security vault in the Nevernever. She returns from an attack against Sanya in Iran in order to prevent Harry and Goodman Grey from kidnapping an investment banker needed for the scheme. Later, she attacks Harry as he is about to open a Way into the Nevernever that will lead to the vault. Her goal in these strikes is to stop the robbery, knowing that Nicodemus intends to sacrifice Deirdre in order to reach the vault, but she does not succeed and Deirdre is killed.

Lasciel
Species: Fallen Angel (although sometimes referred to as a demon)
Description: Member of the Order of the Blackened Denarius

Also known as The Temptress, The Seducer and Webweaver, Lasciel is one of thirty fallen angels that comprise the Order of the Blackened Denarius, demon spirits that are contained within thirty silver coins, each bearing the particular sigil representing the entombed demon's name. Lasciel's coin was offered to Harry Dresden as a "gift" by the leader of the Order, Nicodemus. Harry refused the coin and the immense evil powers brought with it. Later, Harry picked up the coin to prevent the baby Harry Carpenter from touching it. In doing so, Harry "allowed" Lasciel to exert a small measure of influence on his emotions, creating a copy or shadow of Lasciel to live in his mind as well as give him the ability to use Hellfire. Harry buried the coin underneath his laboratory, but the sigil remained on the palm of his hand, and even protected that part of his hand when the rest of it was burned and blackened by flames while facing Mavra. After the events of White Night, the coin was removed and turned over to the Church.

Lasciel returns at the climax of Skin Game with a new host as a jilted lover and enemy of Harry Dresden. Escaping from the Church (due to suspected internal corruption), Lasciel wants revenge on Dresden for being the only person to ever refuse her. Lasciel and Harry's duel ends with Lasciel's host buried under tons of molten rock in Hades's treasure room with a horde of angry shades approaching, and her coin is unlikely to be recovered anytime soon.

Lasciel's most notable traits are her independence; her deft ability to manipulate and seduce others; and her ability to grant the use of Hellfire. She has purple "demon eyes" that appear over her host's eyes and an hourglass symbol on her host's forehead when she's not hiding but taking an active role in things.

Lash
Species: Shadow of the Fallen Angel Lasciel (only exists in Harry's mind)
Description: Exists only to tempt those who have touched the coin of Lasciel into taking it up

As of Dead Beat, Lash has begun to contact Harry directly in his mind. She appears (at first separately) as the illusionary woman "Shiela" who helps Harry find the book he is looking for in an occult bookstore, and recalls the ritual printed in the book when he needs it. However, she can only appear to Harry - Butters and Bock are unable to perceive her. She claims to be but a shadow of the Fallen in the coin, and seeks to help him more out of self-preservation than a desire to corrupt. Harry has since found that he is tempted to utilize her knowledge to help in difficult situations. She can use her knowledge to translate languages for Dresden, including German, ghoul (Ancient Sumerian), and ancient Etruscan. Lasciel also speeds up his mind's reaction time temporarily, so they have enough time to talk in a pitched battle. Another skill of Lash's is her ability to be able to teach the host if they have not yet taken up the coin (such as in Harry's case) to retrieve it from great distances at any given time. She is also capable of sensory manipulation by creating illusions and deceiving senses to perceive something that they're not meant to.

In White Night, Dresden gives her the name Lash and convinces her to strive for her freedom since she, as a shadow of the true Lasciel, is actually an independent entity; the true Lasciel still resides in the coin. She's kind of like Lasciel's little twin sister in that the two were originally one before separating, and will become one again if Harry ever takes up Lasciel's coin, but how much of Lash, if any, would remain afterwards is unknown. He insists, repeatedly, that he will not take up the coin; the three years Dresden has "hosted" Lash is the longest period by far anyone has resisted Lasciel's temptation, which apparently also influences Lash.

As Bob later explains, by giving Lash her own name Harry caused her to realize she had this degree of freedom. Lash aids Harry significantly in the final battle of White Night, but when he regains consciousness he finds Lash apparently gone and (as Bob put it) deconstructed. Her final act was to commit a sort of suicide by redirecting a mental assault on Harry's mind to the otherwise unused areas of Harry's brain/subconscious where she resided. As a consequence, Harry became apparently free of Lash/Lasciel's influence; the sigil on his hand faded, and he dug up the coin (which still contains the true Lasciel) and turned it over to Father Forthill and the church for safekeeping. He has, however, mourned her "passing" by shedding tears, stating that "she chose to be free". This was noticed only by Bob, who explained how and why Lash had disappeared.

The first apparent lingering effect of Lash's tenure in Harry's mind is a profound boost in his skill at the guitar; prior to Lash's independence and suicide, he played at a beginner level unless she was actively manipulating him. After the event his skill is shown to be much greater. The loss of Lash also means Harry has also lost the ability to amplify his spells with Hellfire, but he began suffering intense headaches as of Turn Coat. As of the end of Ghost Story, he is told that a parasite kept his heart beating not only just after he was shot, but also while he was healing. In Cold Days Harry learns that some point soon, the parasite will eventually burst forth from his skull and kill him unless Molly assists him seeing how Mab deliberately kept the two apart.

In Skin Game, it is revealed that when Lash died, in an act of love (love being a form of creation) from saving Harry, the remains of her spirit joined with his to create a new spirit of intellect as their "daughter". Both Mab and Demonreach refer to the spirit as a parasite, knowing that it will enter the world with a great deal of knowledge and power but no experience, judgment, or morals to guide it in their use. As the spirit grows, it begins to put increasing strain on Harry's mind, causing him to experience severe headaches, fatigue, and dulled mental focus. At the end of the novel, Molly safely removes the spirit from Harry's mind and transfers it to a wooden skull he had carved to serve as a backup vessel for Bob.

When Lasciel reveals herself to Dresden in Skin Game, she also reveals that she knows their daughter is outgrowing Dresden's head, indicating that though she acknowledges their relationship, she considers the spirit more a valuable resource than a family member.

Mortimer Lindquist
Species: Human
Description: Psychic consultant, Ectomancer

Twenty years prior to the books, Lindquist was considered a gifted investigator, with a high sensitivity to spiritual energies and apparitions; he was even the author of three books on the subject. By the time of the books, however, his abilities appear to have severely atrophied, leaving him trying to earn money as a medium, although his sensitivity is now sufficiently low that in most cases he fails to contact any spirit and must resort to playacting in order to satisfy his clients, essentially a con-artist. He retains some degree of integrity; Harry attributes his loss of ability to the fact that he privately hates what he does. He does retain some degree of contact with the spirit world, however, and his knowledge of such matters is considerable; he is able to provide Harry with some useful insights into the situation when Harry approaches him during the events of Grave Peril.

By the events of Death Masks, Lindquist has apparently changed his ways to some degree and his abilities are returning.

During the events of Dead Beat, Mortimer has become a true ectomancer with the ability to communicate freely with spirits, even though he still cons his customers by only pretending to tell them what they want to hear about their dead relatives and friends. Strangely enough, Lindquist, who has since been perceived by Harry as a selfish, arrogant and all around despicable human being, actually stands up to Harry when he demands his help and the help of the dead against the necromancer threat. Lindquist responds by saying "The dead are terrified of whatever is moving around out there" and that "They may be dead, but that doesn't mean they can't get hurt. I won't risk that for Council infighting". Harry notes that while Mortimer may never lift a finger to help his fellow man, he would stand against a powerful wizard and wizard council to protect the dead. They are the only beings other than himself he seems to really care about. This opinion changes again in Ghost Story when Harry realizes that Morty is actually genuinely caring, and thoughtful when he comforts Murphy. Harry regrets that he had not realized this before.

Mortimer has a sizable role in Ghost Story. He is the first human Harry approaches as a ghost, and Harry persuades him to act as interpreter for those who cannot see or hear him. Harry is surprised to find that Mortimer has a large contingent of defending spirits surrounding his home, including the valiant Sir Stuart Winchester, an ancestor. Morty needs this ghostly army, as he is frequently attacked by, and eventually captured by, hordes of wraiths under the command of an old enemy (later revealed to be the spirit of the Corpsetaker). He displays unexpected depths of courage during his captivity and torture. The true extent of his power is revealed at the end of the story when he seizes control of a vast horde of wraiths and unleashes them to annihilate the Corpsetaker.

Margaret Gwendolyn LeFay McCoy Dresden
Species: Human (deceased)
Description: Wizard/Warlock

Margaret Dresden is Harry Dresden and Thomas Raith's mother. She was the daughter of Ebenezar McCoy, as well as his apprentice, but she rebelled against him and the White Council and ran off. She lived with and was enthralled by Lord Raith, later giving birth to Thomas. She eventually escaped Lord Raith, met Malcolm Dresden, fell in love, and married him. She died while giving birth to Harry due to an entropy curse cast by Lord Raith (her death curse made him unable to feed).

In Blood Rites, she makes an appearance via soulgaze shared by Harry Dresden and his half-brother Thomas Raith.

It is revealed in Turn Coat that the reason the Council considered her dangerous was because she wanted to revamp the Laws of Magic to embrace concepts of political justice, particularly in intervening in mortal political affairs by force of magic, rather than simply limiting the use of power and forbid dark magic. She was well known to the Wardens as someone who made a point of getting as close as possible to breaking the Laws as she could without actually committing a transgression. She was also described as being "brilliant, erratic, passionate, committed, idealistic, talented, charming, insulting, bold, incautious, arrogant... and short-sighted". It is also hinted that she had a habit of mouthing off, even when it put her in danger. In this she is not unlike her son, although Margaret seems to have been far more reckless in her approach. Margaret seemed to have a lot in common with the 1960s hippies in her way of thinking, especially about authority and politics.

Some of her abilities are also detailed; Captain Anastasia Luccio states that Margaret knew more ways through the Nevernever than anyone she had ever met, before or since, and that her many contacts with the Fey was the reason everyone called her "le Fay", which signifies "the faerie". In Changes, Harry's godmother Lea returns to Harry a gem of Margaret's that acts as a "map" to the ways through the Nevernever.

In Peace Talks, it's hinted that she and Lara had some mutual trust towards each other as Lara mentioned that she entrusted Thomas in her care once when she visited McCoy.

Bonea "Bonnie" Dresden
Species: Spirit of intellect
Description: 'Parasite'; child of Harry and Lash.

Bonnie appears first in Ghost Story, mentioned by Demonreach as having kept Harry's body alive while his spirit was separated from it. It is frequently referred to as a "parasite", which is causing increasingly painful headaches for Harry and will eventually kill him by bursting out of his skull. In Skin Game, Mab gives Harry an earring that temporarily stops the spirit from growing and alleviates the pain. Just as the effects wear off, Molly Carpenter successfully extracts the spirit from Harry's mind and transfers it to a wooden skull intended as a backup vessel for Bob.

Bonnie appears in the physical world as a cloud of greenish sparks. In Harry's mental world, she takes the form of a young girl about 12 years of age, whose appearance combines Harry's features with those of important women in his life, such as Karrin Murphy, Susan Rodriguez, and Lash.

Andi Macklin
Species: Werewolf (human stock)
Description: Member of the Alphas

Andi is an extremely sexy and attractive young woman and, as a member of the Alphas, a werewolf; girlfriend of Kirby, another Alphas member.

In Harry's Day Off, she and Kirby need a thorough cleansing to get rid of psychophagic mites, and, by Skin Game, she is the live-in partner of Waldo Butters. In Peace Talks she and Waldo are in a relationship with fellow Alpha Marci.

Elaine Lillian Mallory
Species: Human (wizard)
Description: Wizard

Elaine was an apprentice of Justin DuMorne, taken in by him along with Harry when they were both children. As teenagers, she began a romantic relationship with Harry until Justin showed his darker nature: he enthralled Elaine and attempted to enthrall Harry so he could perform greater black magic. After Harry's victory over DuMorne, Elaine faked her own death and fled to the realms of the Summer Faeries in the Nevernever where she entered into a contract with the Summer Lady Aurora.

In White Night, she is operating as a wizard-for-hire in California, although she is hiding her true power level from the White Council. She still struggles with nightmares and phobias stemming from her enslavement by DuMorne, and feels that only by going out and doing her work can she overcome her fears.

She has taken a page from Dresden's book in setting up her new life in Los Angeles, telling him as much and saying that she's in the phone book, under 'Wizards', just like him. Elaine's new career is similar to his, involving consulting work for police and private investigation, specializing in finding lost children.

She initially seemed interested in rekindling the relationship between them, especially since Harry still has feelings for her. But she saw Susan Rodriguez's photo and engagement ring on a mantle, and realized that Harry had loved too deeply and too recently for her to reenter his life as a lover. However, Harry's lingering feelings mean that a romantic reunion is possible.

According to Turn Coat, she is running the Paranet, an organization of magic practitioners whose talents are not strong enough to qualify them for membership in the White Council.

Elaine prefers to use Egyptian instead of faux Latin for her incantations, and has much less raw power than Harry, using electricity pulled from local power lines instead of simply creating such things. She has a much defter touch with magic than he, and some skill with healing effects. Harry borrows her idea of using power sockets and chains for electricity. She uses earrings and chains instead of blasting rod or staff.

"Mac" McAnally
Species: Unknown (depicted as a human)
Description: Pub owner

McAnally, better known as Mac, owns and runs McAnally's, a pub frequented by the magical fraternity. The barroom is intentionally laid out in such a manner as to disrupt the flow of magical energies, with the aim of preventing any unexpected manifestations that might be caused by a large assemblage of potentially drunk, inexperienced, or angry wizards. It is also noticeably lacking in items of technology that might be found in an ordinary pub, due to the negative effects on technology caused by the presence of a wizard. Taller than average, bald, and of indeterminate age (Harry estimates him to be somewhere between 30 and 50), McAnally gives off a sense of strength and wisdom that commands the respect of his clientele. Although he is a taciturn individual, when he does choose to voice an opinion, Harry generally considers it to be worth listening to. McAnally makes his own dark microbrew beer (always served at room temperature, never chilled) and fantastic steak sandwiches, which he cooks on a wood-burning stove.

McAnally appears to be regarded with some degree of respect by other supernatural groups; his pub is considered neutral ground for all signatories of the Accords. This makes his pub a common meeting place for parties in a dispute who want to discuss matters, such as Harry and Don Paolo Ortega negotiating the terms of their duel in Death Masks. It also means that it is possible to run into some less than desirable creatures inside the pub. Mac keeps a shotgun and a pair of M1911 pistols behind the bar for use in maintaining order. Outsiders do not respect the neutrality of the pub, as shown during Cold Days when they attack it while Harry is inside.

In Dead Beat, Harry bribes a security guard at the medical examiner's office with a batch of Mac's beer so he can get in to see Waldo Butters. In Small Favor, after Karrin Murphy faces down a Gruff that has entered the pub to pick a fight with Harry, Mac shows his respect for her bravery by serving them a particularly good brew (described by Harry as "God's beer").

In Changes, Mac makes his longest speech to date offering wisdom to Harry about the danger of the road he is on and the choices he must make. He advises caution. Once the speech is done, Mac looks visibly pained to have spoken more than three syllables at one time.

In Cold Days, Mac is drawn into Harry's horrible day and reveals hints of unexpected depth, displaying accelerated healing (which he tries to conceal) and familiarity with such high powers as Outsiders and Sidhe Queens. The Outsider refers to him as a "watcher". It is alluded that he once used to be involved in the conflicts of magic, but he refuses to discuss this part of his past beyond saying, "I'm out". Harry attempts to get Mac to talk about his past after one of the skirmishes with the Outsiders telling him "We'll talk about this later". Mac responds with a deadpan look telling Harry flatly, "No, we won't".

In Skin Game, Mac is present when Harry and Mab meet with Kringle (another mantle worn by Donar Vadderung, AKA Odin), and discuss the potential for betrayal by Nichodemus. He and Mab exchange pleasant greetings.

Mac and his microbrews are featured in the two short stories, "Heorot" and "Last Call".

In Peace Talks and Battleground, it is revealed that Mac is a “watcher”, a type of angel.

Martin
Species: Half-vampire (Red Court, deceased)
Description: Member of the Fellowship of St. Giles

Introduced in the book Death Masks, Martin first comes into contact with Dresden as the partner of Susan Rodriguez in the Fellowship of St. Giles. Described as being highly unmemorable in appearance and bland in character, he accompanies Susan back to Chicago with the aim of preventing Don Paolo Ortega from killing Dresden in a duel and taking out the vampire if possible in order to prolong the war between the Red Court and the White Council. While seemingly dismissive of Dresden, Martin nevertheless assists him against members of the Order of the Blackened Denarius, proving himself to be both highly skilled and extremely ruthless in the process. After the duel, he leaves Chicago with Susan, promising Harry that he'll take care of her.

Martin reappears eight years later in the book Changes, when he returns to Chicago with Susan after the kidnap of Maggie Dresden, Susan's daughter with Dresden, with the aim of using her in a bloodline curse to destroy Dresden. He is heavily involved with the events of that book, ultimately accompanying Dresden and his team to their confrontation with the Red Court at Chichen Itza. During the climax of that battle, some of Martin's back story is finally revealed.

For approximately fifty years Martin served the Red Court as a priest, proving his loyalty and devotion, before being assigned to infiltrate the Fellowship of St. Giles as an undercover agent of the Red Court. He then served with the Fellowship for one hundred and fifty years, making him their longest surviving operative, but also working for the Red Court, being provided targets by his secret masters and being allowed to escape from traps that snared other members of the group. After fifty years, including the "detection" and execution of two other Red Court agents within the group, he was deemed trustworthy and spent the next hundred years learning their secrets in order to take them down from the inside. At a critical moment at Chichen Itza, he reveals his allegiance, turning the course of the conflict against Dresden, and reveals that, just before the battle started, Red Court strike teams began taking out Fellowship safe houses under his authority.

He reveals that it was he who informed the Red Court about the existence of Dresden's daughter, something that enrages Susan. Losing all control, she breaks free of his grip and turns on him, tearing his throat out with her teeth, beginning her final conversion to a Red Court vampire. As he dies, he briefly meets Dresden's eyes, beginning a soulgaze that reveals the truth about his actions. While Martin's devotion to the Red Court was initially genuine, it gradually died during his time with the Fellowship as he saw what the Red Court were really like, until he became determined to put an end to his erstwhile masters, no matter what the cost. With that in mind, he had engineered the entire situation at Chichen Itza, telling the Red Court about Maggie, knowing that they would see the possibilities and put preparations in motion to enact a bloodline curse. Aware that telling Susan that he had betrayed her daughter would make her lose control and finally succumb to becoming a full vampire, he arranged that Dresden would be there, knowing that ultimately Dresden would be able to finally put an end to the Red Court by sacrificing the changed Susan in Maggie's place, turning the bloodline curse against the Red Court instead, and wiping them out. Martin's long game was finally finished with the fall of the Red Court, something that he had methodically planned with his customary ruthlessness, knowing that it would require the destruction of the Fellowship, the sacrifice of his partner and ultimately the loss of his own life, something that didn't seem to bother him in the slightest, knowing that it would lead to the completion of his goal.

Margaret Angelica Mendoza Dresden
Species: Human
Description: Child

Margaret ("Maggie") is the daughter of Harry Dresden and Susan Rodriguez, born approximately nine months after Death Masks (when Harry and Susan had their last sexual encounter). Susan named her daughter after Harry's mother and hid her with a family she was friends with, concealing her birth from her father. They were betrayed by Susan's partner Martin, and Maggie was kidnapped by Duchess Arianna Ortega. The Red Court planned to kill her great-grandfather Ebenezer McCoy with a bloodline curse, but Harry and his friends managed to rescue her before the ritual sacrifice.

Maggie was placed in the care of Father Forthill, so he could find a safe place for her to live. He did this by placing Maggie in the family of Michael Carpenter. Mouse acts as her personal protector and companion. It is not yet known if Maggie has any wizard powers, or what effect her time with the Red Court vampires will have on her. Harry is initially afraid to meet her, thinking she might remember him killing her mother, and fear him.

Harry overcomes his fear in Skin Game, where it is revealed that Maggie remembers almost nothing from her encounter with the Red Court and sees Harry as a heroic figure due to Molly Carpenter's stories. Harry is brought to tears when Maggie says that Harry is never around and asks if he wants to be her dad, to which he gratefully agrees.

In the novella Zoo Day, Harry takes Maggie and Mouse to the zoo. Acting on some of the information that Molly has shared with her about supernatural creatures, she recognizes a pack of "haunts" - spirits that possess people to feed on their worst fears - and drives them away on her own.

Mavra
Species: Vampire (Black Court)
Description: Prominent vampire of the Black Court.

She is one of the few surviving members of the Black Court and, therefore, one of the most powerful and fearsome creatures in the vampire community. Thomas tells Harry how the White Court managed to do away with much of Mavra's kind by getting Bram Stoker to publish "Dracula" which is a virtual 'how-to' book on killing Black Court vampires. Mavra, having survived so many centuries despite the devastation of her kind, is extraordinarily powerful, devious, and a proven survivor. In addition to her supernatural powers as a vampire, she is as skilled in the use of magic as a full-fledged wizard and has been a threat to Dresden a few times throughout the novels since her introduction in Grave Peril. Mavra was apparently destroyed by Dresden in Blood Rites, but actually survived - what Harry killed was one of her underlings, which she used as a decoy. More recently in Dead Beat, she acquired the Word of Kemmler, receiving it from Harry as payment for blackmail photos of Karrin Murphy shooting one of Mavra's human servants with a shotgun. What Mavra intends to do with this tome has yet to be revealed. When she was last seen, Dresden threatened to use everything at his disposal, referring to the offer of Knighthood from the Winter Court, his contact with the fallen angel Lasciel, and the Darkhallow, and the standing offer from Lara Raith for him to join her organization, to kill her if she attempted to harm or blackmail Murphy or any of Harry's friends again. "Mavra" is also the modern Greek word for 'black' in its feminine form.

Mister
Species: Domestic cat
Description: Housecat

Mister is an exceptionally large gray tomcat who lives with Harry. In Storm Front, Harry says he found Mister as a small kitten in a trash can, about three years earlier. His tail was torn off by a dog or a car; he hates both. Mister weighs over 30 pounds, due to sheer size rather than fat; Harry muses that Mister is larger than some dogs and that his father "was a wild cat or a lynx or something", but more likely Mister is a Maine Coon. Mac, the owner of McAnally's, will make up the occasional doggy bag for Mister. Mister is uniquely described as the only living thing that appears exactly the same viewed normally or with Harry's Wizard's Sight.

Mister is also occasionally used by Bob, who possesses him in order to move around town during the day without being exposed to sunlight. In Changes, Mister ends up stranded on top of one of Harry's bookcases when the apartment house is set on fire, but he escapes after Harry breaks a window. Ghost Story reveals that he is safe and living with Murphy.

Captain Collin J. "Jack" Murphy
Species: Ghost
Description: Karrin Murphy's father and informal head of Chicago PD's in "between" squad.

Collin J. Murphy, also known as Jack Murphy, is first introduced in Ghost Story as Karrin Murphy's father, and the informal head of the "between" squad dealing with the spirits of people whose death was irregular. He is also responsible for influencing Harry Dresden's actions in such a way for the latter to resolve his own death and return to life.

My Shadow
Species: Temple Dog (or Foo Dog)
Description: Supernatural predator

The bigger brother of Mouse, he was the biggest male of the litter. He and the biggest female of the litter have been kidnapped and raised to be supernatural predators. In "Zoo Day", he attempts to disrupt the family bonding of Harry Dresden and his daughter Maggie.

Don Paolo Ortega
Species: Red Court vampire (deceased)
Description: Duke and war leader of the Red Court; "renowned researcher and debunker of paranormal phenomena".

Ortega was a senior member of the Red Court and acted as a commander in time of war. Outwardly of average appearance, he was a professor specializing in research into paranormal phenomena at the University of Brazil in Rio de Janeiro; a debunker of the paranormal, who "proved" that folklore such as vampires do not exist. He was a formidable and cunning warrior. During the events of Death Masks, he arrived in Chicago to challenge Dresden to a duel, the idea being that, with the instigator of the war between the Red Court and the White Council dead, an end to the conflict would become considerably more likely. If Harry had won, Ortega would have offered to make Chicago neutral ground in the fighting, with Harry and his friends being protected from reprisals as long as they stayed within the city. Harry accepted the deal and the duel, to be moderated by the Archive and based on the respective willpower of the participants, took place at Wrigley Field.

During the duel, Ortega had Harry at a major disadvantage, telling him that he should simply surrender and that, if Harry ultimately defeated him, his vassals would track down and eliminate everybody that Harry cared about, in a blatant infringement of the original deal. This angered Harry, reinforcing his will, giving him the advantage. Ortega pulled a gun and was about to shoot Harry when he was shot himself, leading to the duel falling apart and a short conflict erupting within the stadium. As Harry was winning, and thus had little reason to cheat, he was judged the winner. Ortega escaped, assisted by two of his vassals, retreating to his stronghold in Honduras.

His escape was, however, short-lived. Duke Ortega was eliminated, along with the vast majority of his vassals, by Ebenezar McCoy in his covert role as the Blackstaff; McCoy pulled a deactivated Soviet communications satellite out of orbit, causing it to impact directly on Ortega's mansion. Ortega's widow Arianna later tried twice to get revenge on Harry: first by bidding on him when Madrigal Raith was auctioning him off on eBay (Proven Guilty), then by kidnapping his daughter Maggie for a sacrifice and curse that would have wiped out his entire bloodline (Changes). Harry killed Arianna before she could perform the sacrifice.

Samuel Peabody
Race: Human (deceased)
Description: Wizard/Record Keeper for the White Council

Wizard Samuel Peabody was first introduced in Summer Knight as the bookkeeper for the Senior Council. He is also the wizard who compiled the book Das Lied des Erlking, which included the spell needed to call up the Erlking and the Wild Hunt, in Dead Beat. As of Turn Coat, he is shown as a studious record manager, having his personal study at Edinburgh described as a "bastion of order", and having a personal dislike of Harry, who seldom visits Edinburgh (and thus can't be influenced like the other Wardens) and who is also very disorganized, which Peabody appears to take almost as a personal insult.

At the end of Turn Coat, it is discovered that he had been subtly altering the minds of the Senior Council and the Wardens to effect change. He is named as a traitor having given secrets to the alleged "Black Council". He is killed by Donald Morgan after his escape from the Trial accusing Warden Morgan of the murder of Aleron LaFortier. He had influenced Warden Luccio to commit the murder in a "sleepwalking trance". He is shown to have competent ability at defensive magic, alchemy, potions and close-quarters combat.

At the battle of Demonreach in Turn Coat, it is established that he was not alone; the identity of his companion is unknown, although photographic evidence showed that whoever the other party was, they did not arrive with Peabody from the White Council headquarters in Edinburgh.

Dr. Helena Pounder
Species: Human
Description: Archeologist and mother to Irwin Pounder

She met a Bigfoot named Strength of a River in His Shoulders at a dig site and conceived a child, Irwin Pounder, with him.

Irwin Pounder
Species: Scion (half-human, half-Bigfoot)
Description: Student

He is the son of River Shoulders and Dr. Helena Pounder.

Inari Raith
Species: Human (formerly vampire (White Court))
Description: Adult film production assistant

One of the youngest members of the Raith family, an almost-succubus who, as the Raith rules go, was not given any knowledge of her powers and desire. She was introduced to Harry in the novel Blood Rites while he was investigating magical assault on a porno set where she was working as a production assistant. While Harry was at the Raith estate, she was sent to the room Harry was staying in to indulge in her first feeding of life force, which is always fatal to the victim in question. When she advanced to kiss Harry, the lingering aura of true love radiating from Harry's body (left over from the last time Harry was with his ex Susan) burned her and she fled, confused as to what she was doing and why she was burned. After the happenings at the set are settled, Inari and her fiancé, Bobby, get out of the pornography industry and relocate to California to start a feng shui business. Since she found true love before she ever fed on human lust, she will never become a White Court vampire like the rest of her family. This means that she is free of the curse, but also that she is denied the substantial benefits, like immortality. It is unclear if her offspring are in danger of becoming incubi/succubi.

Henry Rawlins
Species: Human
Description: Police Officer

One of the Chicago PD's "old hands", Rawlins is a cop who gets the job done and has little patience for politics. He has been demoted from detective twice. After he was saved from an unknown creature by Murphy's father, he has kept an open mind about the supernatural. He has been moved to the SI department and been assigned as Murphy's partner. As of Turn Coat, Rawlins is spending ample time at SI "giving the wife ammunition for when she divorces me". He doesn't care if Murphy and Harry rough up a rotten suspect. During Binder's questioning, Rawlins came over the intercom telling Murphy and Harry to move Binder a tad to the left so he could see the full beating on camera. He said he was "making popcorn" at the time. At the end of the rough questioning, Rawlins piped through with the dry comment "I love this channel!"

Rudolph
Species: Human
Description: Police Officer (Internal Affairs)

Before moving to Internal Affairs, Rudolph was a young, inexperienced member of the SI department, under Murphy's command. His placement there was the result of a relationship with a high-ranking city official's daughter. After his transfer to Internal Affairs, he seems to feel nothing but contempt for Murphy and Dresden and as of Small Favor seems to be stirring up whatever trouble he can for SI and rising in rank. In Changes his vendetta against Murphy, Dresden and SI leads him into becoming a pawn of the Red Court and he is seen actively attempting to "set up" Harry. FBI Special Agent Tilly (introduced in Changes) had been set upon Harry by Rudolph's manipulations. Tilly (whom Harry refers to as "Slim") figures out what is really going on in the terms that Rudolph is attempting to make Harry and Murphy look bad. Rudolph has also shown himself to be a coward. During an attempt to discredit Harry and Murphy at the FBI's Chicago office, the lights go out and he looks visibly shaken. Asking what's going on, Harry remarks "Remember the first night we met Rudolph?" referring to the Loup Garou's attack on Chicago PD's lock-up which resulted in the bloody death of numerous Officers and Murphy's former partner Ron Carmichael. Rudolph is described as going into a state resembling a blathering idiot. Rudolph has likely been discredited after the destruction of the Red Court. In Changes, they attempted to silence him by unleashing a demon upon his house to eliminate him.

Rudolph's animosity toward Harry resurfaces in Peace Talks, and he rapidly succumbs to the panic sweeping through Chicago in Battle Ground. His mental state deteriorates to the point that he shoots and kills Murphy after she uses a rocket launcher to kill a giant, confusing her for a terrorist. Harry chases Rudolph down, fully intent on killing him, but Sanya and Butters intervene to stop him.

Sigrun/Ms. Gard
Species: Valkyrie
Description: employee of Monoc Securities (an individual signatory to the Unseelie Accords), supernatural consultant; currently hired out to John Marcone.

Sigrun, who usually uses the alias of "Ms. Gard" is blonde and over six feet tall; in White Night Harry refers to her as "Amazon Gard", referring to her impressive stature. She has the personality of a strong, moral, and honorable warrior who enjoys fighting worthy battles based on a code and mindset of ancient times. Hence, she's willing to do illegal things up to a point without batting an eyelash, defend innocents who need protection, but not selfishlessly or blindly charging in like Dresden would. For example, when pursuing the Grendel's descendant she was hurrying to try to be in time to save the innocent girl who was kidnapped despite not having any connections with her, but not so much that she'd get killed by charging in blindly at full speed like Dresden does. Seems to judge people not only by their position, but also by their conduct, personal code, abilities and use thereof, and some supernatural sense of judging "worthiness". She has shown mastery with axes, swords, flails, and other medieval weaponry, plus abilities consistent with the legendary Norse berserker warriors. Although she can probably use guns at an expert level she seems to prefer using "medieval" weapons, most likely because she's had centuries to hone her abilities, more of an impression when used, more effective for defense as well as offense, more direct and personable, and require skill, discipline and training to use effectively giving more value to her sense of worth, and harder for opponents to use against her. Monoc Securities is based in Norway; the company name is consistent with a reference to Odin ("mon" meaning one, "oc" referring to ocular, Odin having only one eye) in Norse mythology, as is the name of the CEO, Donar Vadderung (surname a possible adaptation of "Father + ing", given name "Odin"). Together with Ms. Gard's reference to both Harry and Marcone as "mortals" during the alley-fight and knowledge of runes in Dead Beat, her appearance, affiliation and combat prowess implied she is one of the Valkyries. This is confirmed in the short story "Heorot", where Ms. Gard acknowledges that she is the Valkyrie Sigrun, though she notes that some of the legends are highly inaccurate. How many of her sister Valkyries are in the company, much less in the Mortal Realm, or what beings other than human mortals work for the company hasn't been revealed yet. Telling Dresden her True Name (or at least part of it) is a huge sign of trust on her part as there are a variety of hostile magics or abilities that can influence, control, harm or kill someone whose True Name was used in the spell (for example, Dresden stated to the reader on his reluctance to trade his full True Name for information to a demon he got "acquainted" with at the end of Storm Front). At the end of the same short story, she gives Harry an intense kiss and suggests that she finds him attractive.

She briefly teams up with Harry to rescue Marcone in Small Favor and even gives Harry her collection of hair and blood samples (after exacting a very restrictive oath from Harry) so he can find her boss. When Harry first encounters her in the novel, she has suffered a deep stomach laceration and is using superglue to close it, which nauseates him greatly. As a Valkyrie she appears to have the ability to know when someone is close to death, especially if the person is worthy of being taken to Valhalla. It is as yet unknown if she is physically incapable of being killed or has an extraordinarily high threshold for injury. She has described the ability as a part of "Monoc Securities health care package".

In Changes, while Harry is pressing Marcone for information in Burger King, Gard takes a phone call from her "employer" at Monoc. She then takes Harry to see the head of Monoc Securities where he's able to learn much about where his daughter has been taken as well as the purpose of her abduction.

In the story "Heorot", she goes against a descendant of Grendel, a traditional foe of her ancient tribe, and Harry aids her in rescuing a kidnapped woman from it. This further expands a feeling of camaraderie between them.

The Naagloshii (Shagnasty)
Species: Skinwalker, Native American semi-divine creature
Description: Mercenary/Agent of the Black Council

The Naagloshii are creatures of Native American mythology, who displeased the Great Spirit and were exiled to Earth. They are vulnerable to the holy chants of the ancient shamans as might demons be to prayers offered to God.

The Skinwalker is the first of these creatures that Harry meets. When viewed through Wizard Sight, the pure evil that the spirit embodies is enough to drive Harry almost mad with terror that such a creature could even exist.

The Skinwalker is an ally or member of the Black Council, and comes in on their behalf. It is capable of shapechanging into an almost unlimited number of forms, including being able to mimic others with near perfect accuracy. It is also possessed of superhuman strength and speed, equal to or exceeding a White Court vampire, with incredible resiliency and regenerative powers as well. On top of all this, it is stated by Donald Morgan in Turn Coat that when a skinwalker kills a spellcaster, it consumes the victim's magic and adds that power to its own.

The Skinwalker that appears in the book initially follows the injured Morgan into Chicago, hoping to add his considerable power to its own. In the course of the novel, it defeats Harry and the forces of the White Court at their home estate, captures and tortures Thomas, forcing him to use his White Court powers repeatedly to survive, kills one of the Alpha Werewolves and maims another, and also beats Harry again at the Battle of Demonreach Island. Only the intervention of Toot Toot and Joseph Listens-to-Wind, though not a holy shaman, is able to avoid the power of its magic, and then in a duel of shapechanging, defeat it and send it running, hurt but not destroyed.

Another Skinwalker was revealed to have been destroyed by Morgan in the 1950s, who lured it into the blast area of a nuclear bomb test before escaping into the Nevernever seconds before the detonation of the bomb slew the Skinwalker.

In Skin Game, Harry notices that Goodman Grey, one member of the vault robbery team hired by Nicodemus, has eyes very similar to those of a naagloshii. Grey reveals that he is the son of a naagloshii father and a human mother.

Shiro
Species: Human (deceased; tortured to death by Nicodemus in Death Masks)
Description: Knight of the Cross

In Death Masks, all three Knights come to Harry's aid when the Denarian Ursiel attacks him in an alley. Shiro is an elderly Japanese man who wears thick glasses and carries his sword, the katana Fidelacchius, in a wooden scabbard (a saya) that doubles as a cane. He is a skilled fighter with both the sword and the cane. Not long after he emigrated from Japan to California, he attended an Elvis Presley concert that also served as a Baptist revival meeting. Due to his poor grasp of English at the time, he ended up inadvertently converting to the faith.

Shiro has dueled vampires in both the Black Court and the secretive Jade Court, and he agrees to serve as Harry's second in the duel against Don Paolo Ortega. However, he urges Harry to avoid the fight if at all possible, saying that the duel can be called off if both parties decide not to go ahead with it. Later, when Harry is taken prisoner by Nicodemus, Shiro secures his release by offering to remain in his place for one day. Nicodemus brutally tortures Shiro, takes him to O'Hare International Airport, and uses his blood in a ritual meant to unleash a deadly plague on the city. Just before dying, Shiro entrusts Fidelacchius to Harry's care.

At the end of the novel, Harry receives a letter from Shiro, postmarked two weeks earlier. Having been diagnosed with terminal cancer, he chose to take Harry's place in order to ensure that Harry would be able to keep fighting Nicodemus. In White Night, Harry does some research on Shiro's family tree and learns that he was distantly related to Yoshimo, one of the White Council's Wardens. In addition, Shiro was a descendant of Shō Tai, the last king of what eventually became Okinawa Prefecture in Japan.

John Stallings
Species: Human
Description: Police Officer (formerly Detective Sergeant, now Lieutenant and Head of Special Investigations)

Introduced in Grave Peril, John Stallings is an older black man who knew Murphy's father well, and has the temerity to address her by nicknames. He is willing to suspend all disbelief of the supernatural to get the job done. He was appointed to Head of Special Investigations after Murphy was demoted during the events of Proven Guilty.

Strength of a River in His Shoulders
Species: Sasquatch/Bigfoot
Description: The father of a lineal descendant called Irwin Pounder.

Strength of a River in His Shoulders, also known as River Shoulders, is a Bigfoot who had a child with Helena Pounder.

In "B is For Bigfoot", he hires Harry between the events of Fool Moon and Grave Peril in order to watch over his son, whom he fears is being assaulted in school. He arranges his affairs through the Native Americans and Ms. Pounder and pays Dresden with a gold nugget.

In "I was a Teenage Bigfoot", He hires Dresden sometime between the events of Dead Beat and Proven Guilty when his son falls ill. Dresden was travelling with a group in search of Bigfoot, when Dresden play-acts into screaming with terror upon seeing River Shoulders, an act which both causes the group to likewise scream and flee, as well as bemuse River Shoulders. As in "B is For Bigfoot", Dresden is paid in a gold nugget.

In "Bigfoot on Campus", set between Turn Coat and Changes, he is hired by Dresden, who instead bargains that River Shoulders' form of payment has to be actual contact with his son. Even when Irwin's life is threatened, River Shoulders show passiveness in intervening with the crisis. Eventually, he takes part in saving Irwin's life and starts repairing their relationship.

In Peace Talks, River Shoulders is in attendance at the conference, updates Harry on events in his life, and it is revealed that after speaking with Injun Joe, the River People have decided to join the Accords. More is revealed about the divisions of his people, and specifically that the Einheriar and other servants of Odin's long hatred of the Grendelkin has included the River People, and part of his presence there is to lay this hatred to rest for the river and sky people. A notable moment during the book is when River Shoulders volunteers to step forward and fight with the other Accord races against the Fomor.

Bianca St. Claire
Species: Vampire (Red Court) (deceased)
Description: Madam of an escort service (The Velvet Room), Margravine and, prior to her destruction, Baroness of the Red Court.

Bianca, like all her kind, is actually a repulsive monster inside the flesh of a beautiful woman. Harry earned her wrath by coming armed into her house during the investigation of one of her prostitutes' deaths, which climaxed with him defending himself from her attack with a handkerchief filled with sunshine. This injured her so that she needed to feed, and she fed too deeply on her favorite servant and killed her. She hated him for that, and blamed him for the death of her friend.

Bianca returns in Grave Peril where she conspires with the Leanansidhe and Black Court vampires. She holds a masquerade ball and invites Harry with the intention of goading him into a fight, thus allowing her to kill him and possibly sparking off a war with the wizards. When that attempt fails and he ends up burning and killing many of the vampires, Bianca turns Harry's girlfriend Susan into a half-vampire, and says that she will forgive him all his past actions, but will keep Susan for herself. She is killed when Harry summons up the ghosts of all the vampires' victims.

The TV version of Bianca is very different from the book version. Bianca is a far more innocuous character, who takes in Harry while he's on the run, and even arranges safe passage elsewhere with little apparent intention of using it against him. She is a club owner and not a madam, and she becomes sexually involved with Harry.

Agent Barry Tilly
Species: Human
Description: FBI agent in Chicago

Harry is arrested by Tilly after Rudolph manipulates the FBI into thinking Dresden should be the prime suspect in the destruction of the building in which Harry had his office. He explains that he can easily tell when someone is lying to him, and Harry feels a tingle in Tilly's hand when he shakes it, suggesting that Tilly's skill may be due to a small amount of magical talent. Tilly seems to have an open mind and is very calm under pressure. He does not balk when Harry tells him about the supernatural and maintains his composure during a Red Court attack on the FBI's Chicago Division building. Harry nicknames Tilly "Slim". Karrin Murphy and Tilly know each other well enough that Karrin shouts to get his attention in the FBI building during the Red Court's attack. Tilly made an appearance in Peace Talks as a representative of the US government.

Toot-Toot
Species: Dew Drop Fairy
Description: General of the 'Za Lord's Guard

First seen in Storm Front, Toot-Toot Minimus is one of the "Little Folk" of the realm of Faerie. In Changes, Toot takes offense at being called a Domovoi, insisting that he is a Polevoi.

During Toot's first appearance, he threatens to tell the Queen Titania that the wizard had bound him into a circle, implying that Toot is bound to the Summer Court. However, he later indicates that he is a Wyldfae and is only called to a court during times of war.

He is described as a tiny pale lavender creature surrounded by a silver nimbus of light with silver dragonfly wings and a shaggy mane of pale magenta hair (later described as lavender in both Small Favor and Changes). In Storm Front, he is first estimated to be about six inches in height, but he grows substantially as the series progresses.

By Small Favor Toot has doubled in size and taken command of the "Za Lord's Guard", a group of little folk Harry freed during White Night. "Za Lord" is his nickname for Harry, who originally secured the allegiance of Toot and several other pixies by giving them pizza. Toot and his troops protect the brownies who clean Harry's apartment from "the dread beast Mister" and also exterminate any pests that get into it. The little folk get past Harry's threshold, the protective barrier around his home that repels supernatural beings. Harry has stated that the little folk are everywhere anyhow, and anywhere they are not they can get to, suggesting that most defenses intended to keep out magical/mundane creatures are ineffective against pixies. The increase in Toot's power and authority may be responsible for his increased size.

In Summer Knight, he and several other pixies surprised and killed Aurora, then the Summer Lady, with steel box cutters (cold iron being a bane to faeries). The pixies were able to safely hold the knives due to their plastic handles.

Toot-Toot is intelligent but often behaves innocent of danger and tends to act very childishly even while being serious, such as writing "pizza or death" on his box knife and imitating Gunnery Sergeant Hartman from Full Metal Jacket. Toot, like all little folk, has a relatively short memory, watches a great deal of events concerning mortals as entertainment, is insane about pizza, and has a higher emotional state due to his size. Harry's relationship with him has changed since Storm Front: where once Harry would have trapped Toot and bribed him with pizza until he did what he wanted, now he treats Toot with far more respect, and only has to call for him and offer payment. Toot is very loyal to Harry. In Turn Coat, Toot attacked a very large and powerful entity (the Skinwalker) in an attempt to protect Harry.

By the novel Turn Coat, Toot has amassed quite an army under the "Za Lord" and is noted by Harry to be the tallest Dewdrop fairy he has ever met (standing a full 12 inches tall). In Changes, Toot is described as being "the size of a hunting falcon" and "nearly fifteen full inches" tall. By Cold Days he is eighteen inches, and has taken a liking to another fairy, Lacuna, a female of his same size. This may be building into something more grand as in the world of the Fae, belief and followers equal power and if Toot continues to recruit more into the "Za Lord's Army" he may become an unattached Faerie with quite a lot of power. Toot-Toot has also switched allegiance from Wild Fae to the Winter Court, presumably because of his service to Harry, who has become the Winter Knight.

In an interview, Jim Butcher was asked what might become of Toot-Toot, and replied "how do you think the Sidhe come into being?"

Uriel
Species: Archangel
Description: Heaven's 'spymaster'

In Small Favor, Harry inexplicably finds himself able to use Soulfire, the Heavenly equivalent to Hellfire. After Michael Carpenter is near-fatally injured, Harry heads to a hospital chapel to rant at God. An elderly janitor comes by to talk to him about God's true nature and suggests that an archangel was helping in their work, then vanishes, leaving behind a copy of Tolkien's "The Two Towers" with the line "The burned hand teaches best" underlined. Mab hints to Harry that the janitor he met really was "The Watchman", whom she later identifies as Uriel, although she orders Harry not to say his name lightly.

He later learns that his Soulfire is likely a gift from the archangel Uriel, who seems to have taken an interest in him. Mab states that "of the archangels, I like him the most. He is the quiet one. The subtle one. The one least known. And by far the most dangerous". Most of his actions are either unknown or conjecture. He is, according to Bob, the angel responsible for the deaths of the firstborn of Egypt.

Harry also learns that he can not use the Soulfire too much, as it is fueled with his soul.  However, in time, souls regenerate through having a good time and doing things that "uplift the human spirit".

In the short story, "Warrior" published in the anthology "Mean Streets" (January 2009), Uriel appears as "Jake" to Dresden in the final scene. Dresden believes he may be having a hallucination due to head trauma or the Scotch he is drinking. Nevertheless, Dresden carries on a discussion with Uriel in the balcony of St. Mary of the Angels Church. Uriel appears in response to Harry's musing over the argument Michael has with the fallen priest, Father Douglas. Uriel admits "I don't exactly make it a habit to do this, but if you've got questions, ask them". Harry and Uriel then have a conversation and Uriel explains to Harry that his actions often have "metaphorical" outcomes. He then explains how Harry often does good by his interactions with people separate from his magical actions. He then points to acts of kindness done this very day that have long term positive outcomes on the people Dresden has interacted with. Uriel tells Harry that God, while allowing free will and choice, often places people into the "right" situations. Uriel also tells Harry that he has often been manipulated by God into such situations. He also discusses Harry's actions at the end of Small Favor which resulted in Michael's near death. Dresden jokes that "You dragged me into this mess. You can pay me, same as any other client". Uriel expresses disbelief "you're trying to bill the Lord God Almighty?" and then Uriel disappears leaving Harry alone to ponder what he has just learned.

Uriel appears in a new form in Changes when Harry summons him and asks for his help in retrieving Maggie. Uriel sadly says that he has already overreached what he is allowed to do for Harry and that he is unable to do more at the moment, but offers him some peace of mind by revealing that Maggie is indeed his own daughter.

In Ghost Story, it is revealed that Uriel—or at least his people—have manipulated Harry into revisiting Earth as a soul without a body, leaving his soul vulnerable to instant destruction. This "gamble" infuriates Mab. At the end of the novel, he shows Harry what has become of his allies and helps him to resist Mab by whispering in his ear, but when Harry familiarly calls him "Uri", Uriel reacts with great anger. "El" being a Hebrew word for God, Uriel's anger toward Dresden may not have come from his familiarity, but with his dropping of what Uriel deems to be "rather important to who and what [he is]". Harry's dropping of the "-el" from his name also appears to frighten Uriel as well as Harry. This is supported by Uriel not objecting to another nickname that Harry proposes: Mr. Sunshine.

Uriel appears in Skin Game, where he begs Michael not to offer himself as a sacrifice to Nicodemus in exchange for letting Harry, Murphy and Waldo Butters live. Nicodemus mocks Uriel's powerlessness in the face of Michael's free willed choice of self-sacrifice. Despite being furious at the provocation, Uriel appears to give up and walk away. However, he quietly instructs Butters to fetch Amoracchius, and transfers his own power to Michael, returning him to full health and giving him the ability to face Nicodemus once more as a Knight of the Cross.

After Nicodemus gives in and walks away from the conflict, Uriel is revealed to have been reduced to a mortal, with the possibility that he can now be injured or even killed, and with the added danger that if Michael were to misuse his power, the archangel would become one of the Fallen. Harry convinces Michael not to return Uriel's power, with the risk balanced against the possibility of saving the souls of Nicodemus's mislead servants. During the final assault on the Carpenter home, Uriel takes part in the fight and even uses a kitchen knife to kill one of the assailants.

After Nicodemus is defeated and forced to flee, Uriel regains his power as an archangel, and he and Harry have a final discussion about the events of the previous few days before he leaves.

In all of his appearances, Uriel seems to be greatly concerned with protecting mortals' free will and maintaining balance among the angelic beings. He also declares himself a "Star Wars" fan, preferring it to "Star Trek" due to the former's clarity of the Good vs. Evil battle with little gray area.

Donar Vadderung
Species: God
Description: Head of Monoc Securities

Vadderung appears in Changes after being indirectly referenced numerous times by Sigrun/Gard throughout the series. He appears as a man in his mid-50s with salt/pepper hair and a gray beard. He has an eyepatch over his left eye and has, in Harry's words, an air of power and authority about him. He provides Harry with much information on the location of his daughter Maggie and the purpose of her kidnapping, all while warning Harry of the danger he will face rescuing her. He demonstrates his power by casually pinning Harry to the floor with nothing but the power of his will rendering Dresden helpless. He is revealed to be the Norse god Odin.

At the end of Changes, Harry looks at the departing Gray Council and notices one of the taller members staring at him. From the depths of the gray hood, Harry can make out Vadderung's features and the latter offers Harry a salute before departing. Harry's grandfather tells Harry Vadderung does not "throw in" often and Harry should feel honored he was willing to help.

He appears in Cold Days several times and slyly shows Harry that one of his mantles is that of Kringle, or the real Santa Claus. In the mantle of Kringle, he is considered to be a Winter King, with power on the same level as Queen Mab.

In Skin Game, it is heavily implied that Vadderung is one of the most well-informed individuals in the Dresdenverse. Harry goes to him for advice on how to beat Nicodemus. Vadderung also notes that as Kringle he is a vassal of Winter, but as Vadderung he can tell Mab to get in line.

Anna Valmont
Species: Human
Description: Thief

In Death Masks, she is a member of the "Churchmice" and takes part in an attempt to steal the Shroud of Turin.

In Skin Game, she is a member of the groups that enters Hades to steal the Holy Grail.

Tera West
Species: Wolfwere (lupine stock)
Description: Fiancée of Harley MacFinn/Outdoorswoman

In Fool Moon, Tera is the fiancée of Harley MacFinn. The lack of a soulgaze on eye contact with her leads Harry to conclude she is not human. She was able to change into a wolf at will and seemed to move more gracefully than other werewolf variants introduced in the novel. At the end of the story, she transforms into a wolf and joins a pack, leading Harry to surmise that, in an inversion of the werewolf concept, she was a wolf able to take on a human form.

When Harry first encounters Senior Council wizard Listens to Wind, the old Native American passes on Tera's regards.

Sir Stuart Winchester
Species: Ghost
Description: Spirit guardian of his descendant Mortimer Lindquist

In life a captain in the Colonial Marines, and an ancestor of Mortimer Lindquist, Sir Stuart Winchester watches over his descendant's life and action, in order to allow him to grow up and learn to stand on his feet. Among his other duties, Sir Stuart and a squad of other spirits watch over Mortimer's house to deny to any uninvited ghost(s), prominent among which wraiths and lemurs.

Benjamin Yardley
Species: Human
Description: Detective lieutenant

Detective Lieutenant Benjamin Yardley is the older brother of Megan Yardley. He has little understanding of her gifts, but trusts her implicitly and is very protective of her and her children.

Megan Yardley
Species: Human
Description: Self-employed

A practitioner, Megan Yardley is a mother of three. When they are harassed by a supernatural entity, she requests Harry Dresden's help.

References